

47001–47100 

|-bgcolor=#E9E9E9
| 47001 ||  || — || October 14, 1998 || Anderson Mesa || LONEOS || — || align=right | 5.6 km || 
|-id=002 bgcolor=#fefefe
| 47002 Harlingten ||  ||  || October 20, 1998 || Caussols || ODAS || NYS || align=right | 2.1 km || 
|-id=003 bgcolor=#E9E9E9
| 47003 ||  || — || October 23, 1998 || Višnjan Observatory || K. Korlević || MAR || align=right | 3.7 km || 
|-id=004 bgcolor=#E9E9E9
| 47004 ||  || — || October 23, 1998 || Višnjan Observatory || K. Korlević || — || align=right | 3.0 km || 
|-id=005 bgcolor=#E9E9E9
| 47005 Chengmaolan ||  ||  || October 16, 1998 || Xinglong || SCAP || — || align=right | 4.0 km || 
|-id=006 bgcolor=#E9E9E9
| 47006 ||  || — || October 16, 1998 || Kitt Peak || Spacewatch || — || align=right | 3.6 km || 
|-id=007 bgcolor=#E9E9E9
| 47007 ||  || — || October 23, 1998 || Višnjan Observatory || K. Korlević || — || align=right | 2.4 km || 
|-id=008 bgcolor=#E9E9E9
| 47008 ||  || — || October 27, 1998 || Catalina || CSS || — || align=right | 6.6 km || 
|-id=009 bgcolor=#E9E9E9
| 47009 ||  || — || October 27, 1998 || Catalina || CSS || — || align=right | 6.4 km || 
|-id=010 bgcolor=#d6d6d6
| 47010 ||  || — || October 28, 1998 || Višnjan Observatory || K. Korlević || — || align=right | 7.2 km || 
|-id=011 bgcolor=#E9E9E9
| 47011 ||  || — || October 17, 1998 || Anderson Mesa || LONEOS || — || align=right | 3.8 km || 
|-id=012 bgcolor=#E9E9E9
| 47012 ||  || — || October 18, 1998 || La Silla || E. W. Elst || — || align=right | 4.2 km || 
|-id=013 bgcolor=#E9E9E9
| 47013 ||  || — || October 18, 1998 || La Silla || E. W. Elst || — || align=right | 8.5 km || 
|-id=014 bgcolor=#E9E9E9
| 47014 ||  || — || October 28, 1998 || Socorro || LINEAR || — || align=right | 4.5 km || 
|-id=015 bgcolor=#E9E9E9
| 47015 || 1998 VW || — || November 10, 1998 || Socorro || LINEAR || — || align=right | 5.2 km || 
|-id=016 bgcolor=#d6d6d6
| 47016 ||  || — || November 10, 1998 || Caussols || ODAS || — || align=right | 5.7 km || 
|-id=017 bgcolor=#E9E9E9
| 47017 ||  || — || November 11, 1998 || Caussols || ODAS || — || align=right | 4.2 km || 
|-id=018 bgcolor=#d6d6d6
| 47018 ||  || — || November 11, 1998 || Caussols || ODAS || — || align=right | 4.6 km || 
|-id=019 bgcolor=#E9E9E9
| 47019 ||  || — || November 8, 1998 || Nachi-Katsuura || Y. Shimizu, T. Urata || RAF || align=right | 3.1 km || 
|-id=020 bgcolor=#E9E9E9
| 47020 ||  || — || November 10, 1998 || Socorro || LINEAR || — || align=right | 7.2 km || 
|-id=021 bgcolor=#E9E9E9
| 47021 ||  || — || November 10, 1998 || Socorro || LINEAR || — || align=right | 4.2 km || 
|-id=022 bgcolor=#E9E9E9
| 47022 ||  || — || November 10, 1998 || Socorro || LINEAR || — || align=right | 4.6 km || 
|-id=023 bgcolor=#E9E9E9
| 47023 ||  || — || November 10, 1998 || Socorro || LINEAR || — || align=right | 4.5 km || 
|-id=024 bgcolor=#E9E9E9
| 47024 ||  || — || November 10, 1998 || Socorro || LINEAR || — || align=right | 4.1 km || 
|-id=025 bgcolor=#E9E9E9
| 47025 ||  || — || November 10, 1998 || Socorro || LINEAR || XIZ || align=right | 3.3 km || 
|-id=026 bgcolor=#E9E9E9
| 47026 ||  || — || November 10, 1998 || Socorro || LINEAR || — || align=right | 5.5 km || 
|-id=027 bgcolor=#E9E9E9
| 47027 ||  || — || November 10, 1998 || Socorro || LINEAR || — || align=right | 3.5 km || 
|-id=028 bgcolor=#E9E9E9
| 47028 ||  || — || November 12, 1998 || Gekko || T. Kagawa || — || align=right | 3.8 km || 
|-id=029 bgcolor=#d6d6d6
| 47029 ||  || — || November 12, 1998 || Višnjan Observatory || K. Korlević || ALA || align=right | 12 km || 
|-id=030 bgcolor=#fefefe
| 47030 ||  || — || November 12, 1998 || Zeno || T. Stafford || — || align=right | 3.7 km || 
|-id=031 bgcolor=#E9E9E9
| 47031 ||  || — || November 10, 1998 || Socorro || LINEAR || — || align=right | 3.9 km || 
|-id=032 bgcolor=#E9E9E9
| 47032 ||  || — || November 13, 1998 || Socorro || LINEAR || — || align=right | 5.1 km || 
|-id=033 bgcolor=#E9E9E9
| 47033 ||  || — || November 14, 1998 || Socorro || LINEAR || — || align=right | 4.7 km || 
|-id=034 bgcolor=#d6d6d6
| 47034 ||  || — || November 14, 1998 || Socorro || LINEAR || — || align=right | 4.5 km || 
|-id=035 bgcolor=#FA8072
| 47035 || 1998 WS || — || November 17, 1998 || Socorro || LINEAR || — || align=right | 11 km || 
|-id=036 bgcolor=#d6d6d6
| 47036 ||  || — || November 18, 1998 || Oizumi || T. Kobayashi || EOS || align=right | 5.8 km || 
|-id=037 bgcolor=#fefefe
| 47037 ||  || — || November 17, 1998 || Catalina || CSS || PHO || align=right | 3.5 km || 
|-id=038 bgcolor=#E9E9E9
| 47038 Majoni ||  ||  || November 17, 1998 || Pianoro || V. Goretti || — || align=right | 6.5 km || 
|-id=039 bgcolor=#d6d6d6
| 47039 ||  || — || November 19, 1998 || Caussols || ODAS || — || align=right | 8.8 km || 
|-id=040 bgcolor=#d6d6d6
| 47040 ||  || — || November 19, 1998 || Caussols || ODAS || THM || align=right | 9.8 km || 
|-id=041 bgcolor=#d6d6d6
| 47041 ||  || — || November 19, 1998 || Oizumi || T. Kobayashi || — || align=right | 7.4 km || 
|-id=042 bgcolor=#d6d6d6
| 47042 ||  || — || November 19, 1998 || Oizumi || T. Kobayashi || KOR || align=right | 3.9 km || 
|-id=043 bgcolor=#E9E9E9
| 47043 ||  || — || November 18, 1998 || Socorro || LINEAR || — || align=right | 4.0 km || 
|-id=044 bgcolor=#E9E9E9
| 47044 Mcpainter ||  ||  || November 16, 1998 || Fair Oaks Ranch || J. V. McClusky || — || align=right | 3.5 km || 
|-id=045 bgcolor=#E9E9E9
| 47045 Seandaniel ||  ||  || November 29, 1998 || Baton Rouge || W. R. Cooney Jr. || AGN || align=right | 4.0 km || 
|-id=046 bgcolor=#E9E9E9
| 47046 ||  || — || November 26, 1998 || Višnjan Observatory || K. Korlević || — || align=right | 6.7 km || 
|-id=047 bgcolor=#E9E9E9
| 47047 ||  || — || November 21, 1998 || Socorro || LINEAR || — || align=right | 6.8 km || 
|-id=048 bgcolor=#E9E9E9
| 47048 ||  || — || November 21, 1998 || Socorro || LINEAR || — || align=right | 5.1 km || 
|-id=049 bgcolor=#E9E9E9
| 47049 ||  || — || November 25, 1998 || Socorro || LINEAR || — || align=right | 6.5 km || 
|-id=050 bgcolor=#d6d6d6
| 47050 ||  || — || November 18, 1998 || Socorro || LINEAR || — || align=right | 13 km || 
|-id=051 bgcolor=#E9E9E9
| 47051 || 1998 XZ || — || December 7, 1998 || Caussols || ODAS || — || align=right | 4.8 km || 
|-id=052 bgcolor=#E9E9E9
| 47052 ||  || — || December 7, 1998 || Caussols || ODAS || HEN || align=right | 2.9 km || 
|-id=053 bgcolor=#d6d6d6
| 47053 ||  || — || December 7, 1998 || Caussols || ODAS || — || align=right | 4.2 km || 
|-id=054 bgcolor=#E9E9E9
| 47054 ||  || — || December 7, 1998 || Caussols || ODAS || GEF || align=right | 3.5 km || 
|-id=055 bgcolor=#d6d6d6
| 47055 ||  || — || December 10, 1998 || High Point || D. K. Chesney || — || align=right | 8.5 km || 
|-id=056 bgcolor=#d6d6d6
| 47056 ||  || — || December 8, 1998 || Kitt Peak || Spacewatch || — || align=right | 9.8 km || 
|-id=057 bgcolor=#E9E9E9
| 47057 ||  || — || December 9, 1998 || Xinglong || SCAP || — || align=right | 5.0 km || 
|-id=058 bgcolor=#E9E9E9
| 47058 ||  || — || December 15, 1998 || Caussols || ODAS || GEF || align=right | 3.7 km || 
|-id=059 bgcolor=#d6d6d6
| 47059 ||  || — || December 10, 1998 || Kitt Peak || Spacewatch || — || align=right | 6.5 km || 
|-id=060 bgcolor=#E9E9E9
| 47060 ||  || — || December 14, 1998 || Socorro || LINEAR || — || align=right | 5.5 km || 
|-id=061 bgcolor=#d6d6d6
| 47061 ||  || — || December 14, 1998 || Socorro || LINEAR || — || align=right | 7.8 km || 
|-id=062 bgcolor=#d6d6d6
| 47062 ||  || — || December 14, 1998 || Socorro || LINEAR || — || align=right | 8.4 km || 
|-id=063 bgcolor=#d6d6d6
| 47063 ||  || — || December 14, 1998 || Socorro || LINEAR || KOR || align=right | 5.1 km || 
|-id=064 bgcolor=#E9E9E9
| 47064 ||  || — || December 14, 1998 || Socorro || LINEAR || — || align=right | 6.8 km || 
|-id=065 bgcolor=#d6d6d6
| 47065 ||  || — || December 15, 1998 || Socorro || LINEAR || — || align=right | 4.1 km || 
|-id=066 bgcolor=#E9E9E9
| 47066 ||  || — || December 15, 1998 || Socorro || LINEAR || MIS || align=right | 7.5 km || 
|-id=067 bgcolor=#E9E9E9
| 47067 ||  || — || December 15, 1998 || Kitt Peak || Spacewatch || — || align=right | 1.7 km || 
|-id=068 bgcolor=#E9E9E9
| 47068 ||  || — || December 9, 1998 || Socorro || LINEAR || — || align=right | 4.7 km || 
|-id=069 bgcolor=#d6d6d6
| 47069 ||  || — || December 14, 1998 || Socorro || LINEAR || slow || align=right | 6.2 km || 
|-id=070 bgcolor=#E9E9E9
| 47070 ||  || — || December 15, 1998 || Granville || R. G. Davis || — || align=right | 6.6 km || 
|-id=071 bgcolor=#E9E9E9
| 47071 ||  || — || December 15, 1998 || Socorro || LINEAR || — || align=right | 4.0 km || 
|-id=072 bgcolor=#d6d6d6
| 47072 ||  || — || December 15, 1998 || Socorro || LINEAR || SAN || align=right | 6.7 km || 
|-id=073 bgcolor=#d6d6d6
| 47073 ||  || — || December 15, 1998 || Socorro || LINEAR || — || align=right | 6.8 km || 
|-id=074 bgcolor=#d6d6d6
| 47074 ||  || — || December 15, 1998 || Socorro || LINEAR || — || align=right | 10 km || 
|-id=075 bgcolor=#d6d6d6
| 47075 || 1998 YB || — || December 16, 1998 || Višnjan Observatory || K. Korlević || THM || align=right | 9.8 km || 
|-id=076 bgcolor=#d6d6d6
| 47076 || 1998 YV || — || December 16, 1998 || Oizumi || T. Kobayashi || THM || align=right | 9.8 km || 
|-id=077 bgcolor=#d6d6d6
| 47077 Yuji ||  ||  || December 16, 1998 || Kuma Kogen || A. Nakamura || — || align=right | 13 km || 
|-id=078 bgcolor=#d6d6d6
| 47078 ||  || — || December 17, 1998 || Caussols || ODAS || — || align=right | 16 km || 
|-id=079 bgcolor=#E9E9E9
| 47079 ||  || — || December 16, 1998 || Uenohara || N. Kawasato || — || align=right | 7.5 km || 
|-id=080 bgcolor=#d6d6d6
| 47080 ||  || — || December 22, 1998 || Višnjan Observatory || K. Korlević || — || align=right | 5.2 km || 
|-id=081 bgcolor=#E9E9E9
| 47081 ||  || — || December 25, 1998 || Višnjan Observatory || K. Korlević, M. Jurić || MIS || align=right | 6.7 km || 
|-id=082 bgcolor=#d6d6d6
| 47082 ||  || — || December 22, 1998 || Kitt Peak || Spacewatch || TEL || align=right | 3.9 km || 
|-id=083 bgcolor=#E9E9E9
| 47083 ||  || — || December 29, 1998 || Starkenburg Observatory || Starkenburg Obs. || — || align=right | 4.5 km || 
|-id=084 bgcolor=#d6d6d6
| 47084 || 1999 AQ || — || January 4, 1999 || Farra d'Isonzo || Farra d'Isonzo || EOS || align=right | 5.1 km || 
|-id=085 bgcolor=#d6d6d6
| 47085 ||  || — || January 7, 1999 || Kitt Peak || Spacewatch || THM || align=right | 6.2 km || 
|-id=086 bgcolor=#E9E9E9
| 47086 Shinseiko ||  ||  || January 10, 1999 || Hadano Obs. || A. Asami || — || align=right | 10 km || 
|-id=087 bgcolor=#fefefe
| 47087 ||  || — || January 10, 1999 || Oizumi || T. Kobayashi || — || align=right | 3.9 km || 
|-id=088 bgcolor=#d6d6d6
| 47088 ||  || — || January 9, 1999 || Višnjan Observatory || K. Korlević || — || align=right | 4.6 km || 
|-id=089 bgcolor=#fefefe
| 47089 ||  || — || January 9, 1999 || Višnjan Observatory || K. Korlević || — || align=right | 2.6 km || 
|-id=090 bgcolor=#fefefe
| 47090 ||  || — || January 9, 1999 || Višnjan Observatory || K. Korlević || — || align=right | 3.2 km || 
|-id=091 bgcolor=#d6d6d6
| 47091 ||  || — || January 10, 1999 || Xinglong || SCAP || KOR || align=right | 5.3 km || 
|-id=092 bgcolor=#E9E9E9
| 47092 ||  || — || January 13, 1999 || Višnjan Observatory || K. Korlević || AER || align=right | 4.5 km || 
|-id=093 bgcolor=#fefefe
| 47093 ||  || — || January 10, 1999 || Višnjan Observatory || K. Korlević || NYS || align=right | 5.1 km || 
|-id=094 bgcolor=#fefefe
| 47094 ||  || — || January 15, 1999 || Višnjan Observatory || K. Korlević || — || align=right | 2.1 km || 
|-id=095 bgcolor=#d6d6d6
| 47095 ||  || — || January 15, 1999 || Caussols || ODAS || THM || align=right | 7.6 km || 
|-id=096 bgcolor=#d6d6d6
| 47096 ||  || — || January 15, 1999 || Mallorca || R. Pacheco, Á. López J. || — || align=right | 11 km || 
|-id=097 bgcolor=#d6d6d6
| 47097 ||  || — || January 15, 1999 || Farra d'Isonzo || Farra d'Isonzo || — || align=right | 9.8 km || 
|-id=098 bgcolor=#E9E9E9
| 47098 ||  || — || January 13, 1999 || Kitt Peak || Spacewatch || HEN || align=right | 2.7 km || 
|-id=099 bgcolor=#E9E9E9
| 47099 ||  || — || January 8, 1999 || Anderson Mesa || LONEOS || — || align=right | 6.4 km || 
|-id=100 bgcolor=#fefefe
| 47100 ||  || — || January 23, 1999 || Višnjan Observatory || K. Korlević || — || align=right | 4.2 km || 
|}

47101–47200 

|-bgcolor=#fefefe
| 47101 ||  || — || January 24, 1999 || Črni Vrh || Črni Vrh || — || align=right | 3.9 km || 
|-id=102 bgcolor=#d6d6d6
| 47102 ||  || — || January 20, 1999 || Višnjan Observatory || K. Korlević || HYG || align=right | 9.5 km || 
|-id=103 bgcolor=#d6d6d6
| 47103 ||  || — || January 17, 1999 || Kitt Peak || Spacewatch || THM || align=right | 6.1 km || 
|-id=104 bgcolor=#d6d6d6
| 47104 ||  || — || February 10, 1999 || Socorro || LINEAR || — || align=right | 7.6 km || 
|-id=105 bgcolor=#d6d6d6
| 47105 ||  || — || February 10, 1999 || Socorro || LINEAR || EOS || align=right | 8.2 km || 
|-id=106 bgcolor=#E9E9E9
| 47106 ||  || — || February 10, 1999 || Socorro || LINEAR || MAR || align=right | 4.3 km || 
|-id=107 bgcolor=#d6d6d6
| 47107 ||  || — || February 10, 1999 || Socorro || LINEAR || — || align=right | 6.1 km || 
|-id=108 bgcolor=#d6d6d6
| 47108 ||  || — || February 10, 1999 || Socorro || LINEAR || THM || align=right | 8.3 km || 
|-id=109 bgcolor=#d6d6d6
| 47109 ||  || — || February 10, 1999 || Socorro || LINEAR || — || align=right | 7.3 km || 
|-id=110 bgcolor=#E9E9E9
| 47110 ||  || — || February 10, 1999 || Socorro || LINEAR || DOR || align=right | 6.6 km || 
|-id=111 bgcolor=#d6d6d6
| 47111 ||  || — || February 10, 1999 || Socorro || LINEAR || — || align=right | 8.7 km || 
|-id=112 bgcolor=#d6d6d6
| 47112 ||  || — || February 10, 1999 || Socorro || LINEAR || 7:4 || align=right | 12 km || 
|-id=113 bgcolor=#d6d6d6
| 47113 ||  || — || February 10, 1999 || Socorro || LINEAR || — || align=right | 10 km || 
|-id=114 bgcolor=#d6d6d6
| 47114 ||  || — || February 12, 1999 || Socorro || LINEAR || 7:4 || align=right | 15 km || 
|-id=115 bgcolor=#d6d6d6
| 47115 ||  || — || February 12, 1999 || Socorro || LINEAR || — || align=right | 15 km || 
|-id=116 bgcolor=#d6d6d6
| 47116 ||  || — || February 12, 1999 || Socorro || LINEAR || — || align=right | 9.9 km || 
|-id=117 bgcolor=#d6d6d6
| 47117 ||  || — || February 12, 1999 || Socorro || LINEAR || — || align=right | 6.7 km || 
|-id=118 bgcolor=#E9E9E9
| 47118 ||  || — || February 12, 1999 || Socorro || LINEAR || — || align=right | 6.3 km || 
|-id=119 bgcolor=#d6d6d6
| 47119 ||  || — || February 12, 1999 || Socorro || LINEAR || — || align=right | 10 km || 
|-id=120 bgcolor=#E9E9E9
| 47120 ||  || — || February 10, 1999 || Socorro || LINEAR || MAR || align=right | 5.0 km || 
|-id=121 bgcolor=#fefefe
| 47121 ||  || — || February 10, 1999 || Socorro || LINEAR || V || align=right | 2.4 km || 
|-id=122 bgcolor=#E9E9E9
| 47122 ||  || — || February 10, 1999 || Socorro || LINEAR || — || align=right | 4.3 km || 
|-id=123 bgcolor=#d6d6d6
| 47123 ||  || — || February 10, 1999 || Socorro || LINEAR || HYG || align=right | 7.7 km || 
|-id=124 bgcolor=#d6d6d6
| 47124 ||  || — || February 10, 1999 || Socorro || LINEAR || — || align=right | 7.3 km || 
|-id=125 bgcolor=#d6d6d6
| 47125 ||  || — || February 10, 1999 || Socorro || LINEAR || — || align=right | 8.0 km || 
|-id=126 bgcolor=#d6d6d6
| 47126 ||  || — || February 10, 1999 || Socorro || LINEAR || EOS || align=right | 5.8 km || 
|-id=127 bgcolor=#d6d6d6
| 47127 ||  || — || February 12, 1999 || Socorro || LINEAR || — || align=right | 6.3 km || 
|-id=128 bgcolor=#d6d6d6
| 47128 ||  || — || February 12, 1999 || Socorro || LINEAR || — || align=right | 12 km || 
|-id=129 bgcolor=#d6d6d6
| 47129 ||  || — || February 9, 1999 || Xinglong || SCAP || EOS || align=right | 5.7 km || 
|-id=130 bgcolor=#E9E9E9
| 47130 ||  || — || February 11, 1999 || Socorro || LINEAR || — || align=right | 4.7 km || 
|-id=131 bgcolor=#d6d6d6
| 47131 ||  || — || February 7, 1999 || Kitt Peak || Spacewatch || THM || align=right | 5.8 km || 
|-id=132 bgcolor=#d6d6d6
| 47132 ||  || — || February 14, 1999 || Anderson Mesa || LONEOS || — || align=right | 10 km || 
|-id=133 bgcolor=#E9E9E9
| 47133 ||  || — || February 17, 1999 || Socorro || LINEAR || — || align=right | 4.7 km || 
|-id=134 bgcolor=#E9E9E9
| 47134 ||  || — || February 17, 1999 || Socorro || LINEAR || — || align=right | 4.7 km || 
|-id=135 bgcolor=#fefefe
| 47135 ||  || — || March 8, 1999 || High Point || D. K. Chesney || H || align=right | 1.6 km || 
|-id=136 bgcolor=#d6d6d6
| 47136 ||  || — || March 12, 1999 || High Point || D. K. Chesney || — || align=right | 8.9 km || 
|-id=137 bgcolor=#d6d6d6
| 47137 ||  || — || March 19, 1999 || Socorro || LINEAR || — || align=right | 8.0 km || 
|-id=138 bgcolor=#d6d6d6
| 47138 ||  || — || March 20, 1999 || Socorro || LINEAR || — || align=right | 13 km || 
|-id=139 bgcolor=#d6d6d6
| 47139 ||  || — || April 11, 1999 || Anderson Mesa || LONEOS || — || align=right | 16 km || 
|-id=140 bgcolor=#d6d6d6
| 47140 ||  || — || April 12, 1999 || Socorro || LINEAR || EOS || align=right | 7.3 km || 
|-id=141 bgcolor=#fefefe
| 47141 ||  || — || April 24, 1999 || Reedy Creek || J. Broughton || H || align=right | 2.6 km || 
|-id=142 bgcolor=#fefefe
| 47142 ||  || — || June 8, 1999 || Socorro || LINEAR || H || align=right | 1.4 km || 
|-id=143 bgcolor=#fefefe
| 47143 ||  || — || June 12, 1999 || Socorro || LINEAR || H || align=right | 2.6 km || 
|-id=144 bgcolor=#fefefe
| 47144 Faulkes || 1999 PY ||  || August 7, 1999 || Kleť || J. Tichá, M. Tichý || — || align=right | 3.5 km || 
|-id=145 bgcolor=#FA8072
| 47145 ||  || — || September 7, 1999 || Socorro || LINEAR || H || align=right | 2.1 km || 
|-id=146 bgcolor=#d6d6d6
| 47146 ||  || — || September 7, 1999 || Socorro || LINEAR || — || align=right | 5.0 km || 
|-id=147 bgcolor=#fefefe
| 47147 ||  || — || September 7, 1999 || Socorro || LINEAR || — || align=right | 1.6 km || 
|-id=148 bgcolor=#fefefe
| 47148 ||  || — || September 7, 1999 || Socorro || LINEAR || — || align=right | 4.1 km || 
|-id=149 bgcolor=#fefefe
| 47149 ||  || — || September 11, 1999 || Višnjan Observatory || K. Korlević || — || align=right | 2.7 km || 
|-id=150 bgcolor=#fefefe
| 47150 ||  || — || September 11, 1999 || Višnjan Observatory || K. Korlević || V || align=right | 1.7 km || 
|-id=151 bgcolor=#fefefe
| 47151 ||  || — || September 7, 1999 || Socorro || LINEAR || — || align=right | 4.4 km || 
|-id=152 bgcolor=#fefefe
| 47152 ||  || — || September 7, 1999 || Socorro || LINEAR || — || align=right | 1.7 km || 
|-id=153 bgcolor=#fefefe
| 47153 ||  || — || September 9, 1999 || Socorro || LINEAR || — || align=right | 5.2 km || 
|-id=154 bgcolor=#E9E9E9
| 47154 ||  || — || September 9, 1999 || Socorro || LINEAR || — || align=right | 3.4 km || 
|-id=155 bgcolor=#fefefe
| 47155 ||  || — || September 9, 1999 || Socorro || LINEAR || — || align=right | 2.0 km || 
|-id=156 bgcolor=#fefefe
| 47156 ||  || — || September 9, 1999 || Socorro || LINEAR || FLO || align=right | 1.7 km || 
|-id=157 bgcolor=#d6d6d6
| 47157 ||  || — || September 9, 1999 || Socorro || LINEAR || EOS || align=right | 4.5 km || 
|-id=158 bgcolor=#fefefe
| 47158 ||  || — || September 5, 1999 || Anderson Mesa || LONEOS || — || align=right | 2.0 km || 
|-id=159 bgcolor=#fefefe
| 47159 || 1999 SJ || — || September 16, 1999 || Višnjan Observatory || K. Korlević || NYS || align=right | 1.9 km || 
|-id=160 bgcolor=#E9E9E9
| 47160 ||  || — || September 30, 1999 || Socorro || LINEAR || — || align=right | 4.7 km || 
|-id=161 bgcolor=#fefefe
| 47161 ||  || — || October 1, 1999 || Višnjan Observatory || K. Korlević || FLO || align=right | 1.8 km || 
|-id=162 bgcolor=#fefefe
| 47162 Chicomendez ||  ||  || October 2, 1999 || Monte Agliale || M. M. M. Santangelo || FLO || align=right | 2.1 km || 
|-id=163 bgcolor=#fefefe
| 47163 ||  || — || October 8, 1999 || Kleť || Kleť Obs. || V || align=right | 2.5 km || 
|-id=164 bgcolor=#d6d6d6
| 47164 Ticino ||  ||  || October 10, 1999 || Gnosca || S. Sposetti || — || align=right | 4.8 km || 
|-id=165 bgcolor=#fefefe
| 47165 ||  || — || October 11, 1999 || Višnjan Observatory || K. Korlević, M. Jurić || — || align=right | 1.5 km || 
|-id=166 bgcolor=#fefefe
| 47166 ||  || — || October 15, 1999 || Prescott || P. G. Comba || — || align=right | 1.9 km || 
|-id=167 bgcolor=#E9E9E9
| 47167 ||  || — || October 3, 1999 || Socorro || LINEAR || HEN || align=right | 3.9 km || 
|-id=168 bgcolor=#fefefe
| 47168 ||  || — || October 4, 1999 || Socorro || LINEAR || NYS || align=right | 2.0 km || 
|-id=169 bgcolor=#fefefe
| 47169 ||  || — || October 4, 1999 || Socorro || LINEAR || FLO || align=right | 2.0 km || 
|-id=170 bgcolor=#fefefe
| 47170 ||  || — || October 4, 1999 || Socorro || LINEAR || — || align=right | 1.8 km || 
|-id=171 bgcolor=#C2E0FF
| 47171 Lempo ||  ||  || October 1, 1999 || Kitt Peak || E. P. Rubenstein, L.-G. Strolger || plutinomoon || align=right | 445 km || 
|-id=172 bgcolor=#fefefe
| 47172 ||  || — || October 4, 1999 || Kitt Peak || Spacewatch || — || align=right | 1.4 km || 
|-id=173 bgcolor=#fefefe
| 47173 ||  || — || October 4, 1999 || Kitt Peak || Spacewatch || FLO || align=right | 1.5 km || 
|-id=174 bgcolor=#fefefe
| 47174 ||  || — || October 2, 1999 || Socorro || LINEAR || — || align=right | 2.5 km || 
|-id=175 bgcolor=#fefefe
| 47175 ||  || — || October 2, 1999 || Socorro || LINEAR || — || align=right | 3.4 km || 
|-id=176 bgcolor=#fefefe
| 47176 ||  || — || October 3, 1999 || Socorro || LINEAR || FLO || align=right | 2.0 km || 
|-id=177 bgcolor=#fefefe
| 47177 ||  || — || October 4, 1999 || Socorro || LINEAR || FLO || align=right | 1.6 km || 
|-id=178 bgcolor=#E9E9E9
| 47178 ||  || — || October 4, 1999 || Socorro || LINEAR || — || align=right | 10 km || 
|-id=179 bgcolor=#fefefe
| 47179 ||  || — || October 4, 1999 || Socorro || LINEAR || — || align=right | 2.4 km || 
|-id=180 bgcolor=#fefefe
| 47180 ||  || — || October 4, 1999 || Socorro || LINEAR || — || align=right | 1.7 km || 
|-id=181 bgcolor=#fefefe
| 47181 ||  || — || October 4, 1999 || Socorro || LINEAR || FLO || align=right | 1.3 km || 
|-id=182 bgcolor=#fefefe
| 47182 ||  || — || October 4, 1999 || Socorro || LINEAR || — || align=right | 2.2 km || 
|-id=183 bgcolor=#fefefe
| 47183 ||  || — || October 4, 1999 || Socorro || LINEAR || — || align=right | 1.9 km || 
|-id=184 bgcolor=#fefefe
| 47184 ||  || — || October 4, 1999 || Socorro || LINEAR || — || align=right | 2.4 km || 
|-id=185 bgcolor=#fefefe
| 47185 ||  || — || October 7, 1999 || Socorro || LINEAR || — || align=right | 3.0 km || 
|-id=186 bgcolor=#fefefe
| 47186 ||  || — || October 7, 1999 || Socorro || LINEAR || — || align=right | 1.7 km || 
|-id=187 bgcolor=#fefefe
| 47187 ||  || — || October 7, 1999 || Socorro || LINEAR || — || align=right | 2.4 km || 
|-id=188 bgcolor=#fefefe
| 47188 ||  || — || October 7, 1999 || Socorro || LINEAR || — || align=right | 2.3 km || 
|-id=189 bgcolor=#fefefe
| 47189 ||  || — || October 10, 1999 || Socorro || LINEAR || — || align=right | 2.1 km || 
|-id=190 bgcolor=#fefefe
| 47190 ||  || — || October 10, 1999 || Socorro || LINEAR || V || align=right | 1.8 km || 
|-id=191 bgcolor=#fefefe
| 47191 ||  || — || October 10, 1999 || Socorro || LINEAR || — || align=right | 3.0 km || 
|-id=192 bgcolor=#fefefe
| 47192 ||  || — || October 10, 1999 || Socorro || LINEAR || — || align=right | 2.2 km || 
|-id=193 bgcolor=#fefefe
| 47193 ||  || — || October 10, 1999 || Socorro || LINEAR || FLO || align=right | 1.3 km || 
|-id=194 bgcolor=#fefefe
| 47194 ||  || — || October 10, 1999 || Socorro || LINEAR || FLO || align=right | 1.7 km || 
|-id=195 bgcolor=#fefefe
| 47195 ||  || — || October 10, 1999 || Socorro || LINEAR || — || align=right | 1.7 km || 
|-id=196 bgcolor=#fefefe
| 47196 ||  || — || October 10, 1999 || Socorro || LINEAR || — || align=right | 2.1 km || 
|-id=197 bgcolor=#fefefe
| 47197 ||  || — || October 12, 1999 || Socorro || LINEAR || — || align=right | 1.7 km || 
|-id=198 bgcolor=#fefefe
| 47198 ||  || — || October 12, 1999 || Socorro || LINEAR || — || align=right | 1.6 km || 
|-id=199 bgcolor=#FA8072
| 47199 ||  || — || October 13, 1999 || Socorro || LINEAR || — || align=right | 2.1 km || 
|-id=200 bgcolor=#fefefe
| 47200 ||  || — || October 13, 1999 || Socorro || LINEAR || NYS || align=right | 1.9 km || 
|}

47201–47300 

|-bgcolor=#fefefe
| 47201 ||  || — || October 13, 1999 || Socorro || LINEAR || — || align=right | 3.3 km || 
|-id=202 bgcolor=#fefefe
| 47202 ||  || — || October 15, 1999 || Socorro || LINEAR || FLO || align=right | 1.4 km || 
|-id=203 bgcolor=#fefefe
| 47203 ||  || — || October 1, 1999 || Catalina || CSS || — || align=right | 1.7 km || 
|-id=204 bgcolor=#fefefe
| 47204 ||  || — || October 2, 1999 || Socorro || LINEAR || — || align=right | 2.4 km || 
|-id=205 bgcolor=#fefefe
| 47205 ||  || — || October 3, 1999 || Catalina || CSS || — || align=right | 2.3 km || 
|-id=206 bgcolor=#fefefe
| 47206 ||  || — || October 6, 1999 || Socorro || LINEAR || V || align=right | 1.2 km || 
|-id=207 bgcolor=#fefefe
| 47207 ||  || — || October 8, 1999 || Catalina || CSS || — || align=right | 1.9 km || 
|-id=208 bgcolor=#fefefe
| 47208 ||  || — || October 13, 1999 || Socorro || LINEAR || — || align=right | 1.8 km || 
|-id=209 bgcolor=#fefefe
| 47209 ||  || — || October 9, 1999 || Socorro || LINEAR || — || align=right | 1.6 km || 
|-id=210 bgcolor=#fefefe
| 47210 ||  || — || October 3, 1999 || Socorro || LINEAR || V || align=right | 1.7 km || 
|-id=211 bgcolor=#fefefe
| 47211 ||  || — || October 10, 1999 || Socorro || LINEAR || FLO || align=right | 2.2 km || 
|-id=212 bgcolor=#fefefe
| 47212 ||  || — || October 10, 1999 || Socorro || LINEAR || FLO || align=right | 2.1 km || 
|-id=213 bgcolor=#fefefe
| 47213 ||  || — || October 12, 1999 || Socorro || LINEAR || — || align=right | 2.6 km || 
|-id=214 bgcolor=#fefefe
| 47214 ||  || — || October 12, 1999 || Socorro || LINEAR || — || align=right | 2.6 km || 
|-id=215 bgcolor=#E9E9E9
| 47215 ||  || — || October 10, 1999 || Socorro || LINEAR || JUN || align=right | 7.1 km || 
|-id=216 bgcolor=#fefefe
| 47216 ||  || — || October 29, 1999 || Catalina || CSS || V || align=right | 2.1 km || 
|-id=217 bgcolor=#fefefe
| 47217 ||  || — || October 30, 1999 || Kitt Peak || Spacewatch || — || align=right | 1.8 km || 
|-id=218 bgcolor=#fefefe
| 47218 ||  || — || October 16, 1999 || Kitt Peak || Spacewatch || — || align=right | 1.8 km || 
|-id=219 bgcolor=#E9E9E9
| 47219 Heatherkoehler ||  ||  || October 18, 1999 || Anderson Mesa || LONEOS || MAR || align=right | 7.0 km || 
|-id=220 bgcolor=#fefefe
| 47220 ||  || — || October 31, 1999 || Catalina || CSS || — || align=right | 1.9 km || 
|-id=221 bgcolor=#fefefe
| 47221 ||  || — || November 1, 1999 || Catalina || CSS || V || align=right | 1.7 km || 
|-id=222 bgcolor=#fefefe
| 47222 ||  || — || November 8, 1999 || Gekko || T. Kagawa || V || align=right | 2.2 km || 
|-id=223 bgcolor=#fefefe
| 47223 ||  || — || November 9, 1999 || Oizumi || T. Kobayashi || — || align=right | 3.7 km || 
|-id=224 bgcolor=#fefefe
| 47224 ||  || — || November 8, 1999 || Višnjan Observatory || K. Korlević || V || align=right | 3.0 km || 
|-id=225 bgcolor=#fefefe
| 47225 ||  || — || November 9, 1999 || Catalina || CSS || — || align=right | 4.1 km || 
|-id=226 bgcolor=#fefefe
| 47226 ||  || — || November 8, 1999 || Višnjan Observatory || K. Korlević || — || align=right | 3.8 km || 
|-id=227 bgcolor=#fefefe
| 47227 ||  || — || November 13, 1999 || Oizumi || T. Kobayashi || NYS || align=right | 2.1 km || 
|-id=228 bgcolor=#fefefe
| 47228 ||  || — || November 3, 1999 || Socorro || LINEAR || — || align=right | 1.9 km || 
|-id=229 bgcolor=#fefefe
| 47229 ||  || — || November 3, 1999 || Catalina || CSS || V || align=right | 2.0 km || 
|-id=230 bgcolor=#fefefe
| 47230 ||  || — || November 3, 1999 || Socorro || LINEAR || — || align=right | 1.8 km || 
|-id=231 bgcolor=#fefefe
| 47231 ||  || — || November 3, 1999 || Socorro || LINEAR || FLO || align=right | 1.9 km || 
|-id=232 bgcolor=#fefefe
| 47232 ||  || — || November 3, 1999 || Socorro || LINEAR || — || align=right | 2.2 km || 
|-id=233 bgcolor=#fefefe
| 47233 ||  || — || November 10, 1999 || Socorro || LINEAR || — || align=right | 1.9 km || 
|-id=234 bgcolor=#fefefe
| 47234 ||  || — || November 1, 1999 || Catalina || CSS || — || align=right | 2.3 km || 
|-id=235 bgcolor=#fefefe
| 47235 ||  || — || November 1, 1999 || Catalina || CSS || — || align=right | 3.1 km || 
|-id=236 bgcolor=#fefefe
| 47236 ||  || — || November 3, 1999 || Socorro || LINEAR || V || align=right | 2.9 km || 
|-id=237 bgcolor=#fefefe
| 47237 ||  || — || November 3, 1999 || Socorro || LINEAR || — || align=right | 6.1 km || 
|-id=238 bgcolor=#fefefe
| 47238 ||  || — || November 3, 1999 || Socorro || LINEAR || V || align=right | 3.0 km || 
|-id=239 bgcolor=#E9E9E9
| 47239 ||  || — || November 3, 1999 || Socorro || LINEAR || — || align=right | 3.2 km || 
|-id=240 bgcolor=#fefefe
| 47240 ||  || — || November 3, 1999 || Socorro || LINEAR || NYS || align=right | 2.3 km || 
|-id=241 bgcolor=#fefefe
| 47241 ||  || — || November 3, 1999 || Socorro || LINEAR || NYS || align=right | 5.0 km || 
|-id=242 bgcolor=#fefefe
| 47242 ||  || — || November 3, 1999 || Socorro || LINEAR || FLO || align=right | 2.1 km || 
|-id=243 bgcolor=#fefefe
| 47243 ||  || — || November 3, 1999 || Socorro || LINEAR || — || align=right | 1.9 km || 
|-id=244 bgcolor=#fefefe
| 47244 ||  || — || November 3, 1999 || Socorro || LINEAR || NYS || align=right | 2.0 km || 
|-id=245 bgcolor=#fefefe
| 47245 ||  || — || November 4, 1999 || Socorro || LINEAR || — || align=right | 1.9 km || 
|-id=246 bgcolor=#fefefe
| 47246 ||  || — || November 4, 1999 || Socorro || LINEAR || — || align=right | 2.5 km || 
|-id=247 bgcolor=#fefefe
| 47247 ||  || — || November 4, 1999 || Socorro || LINEAR || FLO || align=right | 1.5 km || 
|-id=248 bgcolor=#fefefe
| 47248 ||  || — || November 4, 1999 || Socorro || LINEAR || FLO || align=right | 1.6 km || 
|-id=249 bgcolor=#fefefe
| 47249 ||  || — || November 4, 1999 || Socorro || LINEAR || NYS || align=right | 2.6 km || 
|-id=250 bgcolor=#fefefe
| 47250 ||  || — || November 4, 1999 || Socorro || LINEAR || EUT || align=right | 2.2 km || 
|-id=251 bgcolor=#fefefe
| 47251 ||  || — || November 4, 1999 || Socorro || LINEAR || — || align=right | 2.7 km || 
|-id=252 bgcolor=#fefefe
| 47252 ||  || — || November 4, 1999 || Socorro || LINEAR || NYS || align=right | 4.4 km || 
|-id=253 bgcolor=#fefefe
| 47253 ||  || — || November 4, 1999 || Socorro || LINEAR || MAS || align=right | 2.0 km || 
|-id=254 bgcolor=#fefefe
| 47254 ||  || — || November 4, 1999 || Socorro || LINEAR || V || align=right | 1.7 km || 
|-id=255 bgcolor=#fefefe
| 47255 ||  || — || November 4, 1999 || Socorro || LINEAR || NYS || align=right | 4.1 km || 
|-id=256 bgcolor=#d6d6d6
| 47256 ||  || — || November 11, 1999 || Xinglong || SCAP || — || align=right | 4.2 km || 
|-id=257 bgcolor=#fefefe
| 47257 ||  || — || November 4, 1999 || Socorro || LINEAR || — || align=right | 2.8 km || 
|-id=258 bgcolor=#fefefe
| 47258 ||  || — || November 4, 1999 || Socorro || LINEAR || — || align=right | 2.1 km || 
|-id=259 bgcolor=#E9E9E9
| 47259 ||  || — || November 4, 1999 || Socorro || LINEAR || — || align=right | 6.4 km || 
|-id=260 bgcolor=#fefefe
| 47260 ||  || — || November 4, 1999 || Socorro || LINEAR || — || align=right | 1.7 km || 
|-id=261 bgcolor=#fefefe
| 47261 ||  || — || November 5, 1999 || Socorro || LINEAR || — || align=right | 2.0 km || 
|-id=262 bgcolor=#fefefe
| 47262 ||  || — || November 5, 1999 || Socorro || LINEAR || — || align=right | 1.7 km || 
|-id=263 bgcolor=#fefefe
| 47263 ||  || — || November 9, 1999 || Socorro || LINEAR || — || align=right | 1.9 km || 
|-id=264 bgcolor=#fefefe
| 47264 ||  || — || November 9, 1999 || Socorro || LINEAR || — || align=right | 2.2 km || 
|-id=265 bgcolor=#fefefe
| 47265 ||  || — || November 9, 1999 || Socorro || LINEAR || — || align=right | 1.8 km || 
|-id=266 bgcolor=#fefefe
| 47266 ||  || — || November 9, 1999 || Socorro || LINEAR || NYS || align=right | 2.1 km || 
|-id=267 bgcolor=#fefefe
| 47267 ||  || — || November 9, 1999 || Socorro || LINEAR || MAS || align=right | 2.0 km || 
|-id=268 bgcolor=#fefefe
| 47268 ||  || — || November 3, 1999 || Kitt Peak || Spacewatch || ERI || align=right | 3.9 km || 
|-id=269 bgcolor=#fefefe
| 47269 ||  || — || November 13, 1999 || Anderson Mesa || LONEOS || FLO || align=right | 4.1 km || 
|-id=270 bgcolor=#d6d6d6
| 47270 ||  || — || November 12, 1999 || Socorro || LINEAR || — || align=right | 4.6 km || 
|-id=271 bgcolor=#fefefe
| 47271 ||  || — || November 11, 1999 || Catalina || CSS || V || align=right | 2.6 km || 
|-id=272 bgcolor=#fefefe
| 47272 ||  || — || November 11, 1999 || Catalina || CSS || — || align=right | 2.1 km || 
|-id=273 bgcolor=#fefefe
| 47273 ||  || — || November 13, 1999 || Catalina || CSS || — || align=right | 2.0 km || 
|-id=274 bgcolor=#E9E9E9
| 47274 ||  || — || November 12, 1999 || Socorro || LINEAR || — || align=right | 1.9 km || 
|-id=275 bgcolor=#fefefe
| 47275 ||  || — || November 14, 1999 || Socorro || LINEAR || — || align=right | 1.8 km || 
|-id=276 bgcolor=#E9E9E9
| 47276 ||  || — || November 14, 1999 || Socorro || LINEAR || — || align=right | 4.6 km || 
|-id=277 bgcolor=#fefefe
| 47277 ||  || — || November 12, 1999 || Kitt Peak || Spacewatch || — || align=right | 1.6 km || 
|-id=278 bgcolor=#fefefe
| 47278 ||  || — || November 14, 1999 || Socorro || LINEAR || — || align=right | 2.1 km || 
|-id=279 bgcolor=#fefefe
| 47279 ||  || — || November 14, 1999 || Socorro || LINEAR || FLO || align=right | 2.0 km || 
|-id=280 bgcolor=#fefefe
| 47280 ||  || — || November 14, 1999 || Socorro || LINEAR || NYS || align=right | 2.1 km || 
|-id=281 bgcolor=#fefefe
| 47281 ||  || — || November 14, 1999 || Socorro || LINEAR || — || align=right | 2.2 km || 
|-id=282 bgcolor=#fefefe
| 47282 ||  || — || November 14, 1999 || Socorro || LINEAR || — || align=right | 2.0 km || 
|-id=283 bgcolor=#fefefe
| 47283 ||  || — || November 15, 1999 || Socorro || LINEAR || V || align=right | 2.0 km || 
|-id=284 bgcolor=#fefefe
| 47284 ||  || — || November 15, 1999 || Socorro || LINEAR || — || align=right | 4.8 km || 
|-id=285 bgcolor=#fefefe
| 47285 ||  || — || November 15, 1999 || Socorro || LINEAR || — || align=right | 2.7 km || 
|-id=286 bgcolor=#fefefe
| 47286 ||  || — || November 4, 1999 || Socorro || LINEAR || FLO || align=right | 1.5 km || 
|-id=287 bgcolor=#fefefe
| 47287 ||  || — || November 6, 1999 || Socorro || LINEAR || — || align=right | 2.8 km || 
|-id=288 bgcolor=#fefefe
| 47288 ||  || — || November 6, 1999 || Socorro || LINEAR || V || align=right | 1.8 km || 
|-id=289 bgcolor=#fefefe
| 47289 ||  || — || November 15, 1999 || Socorro || LINEAR || — || align=right | 2.1 km || 
|-id=290 bgcolor=#fefefe
| 47290 ||  || — || November 15, 1999 || Socorro || LINEAR || V || align=right | 1.8 km || 
|-id=291 bgcolor=#fefefe
| 47291 ||  || — || November 3, 1999 || Catalina || CSS || — || align=right | 2.9 km || 
|-id=292 bgcolor=#fefefe
| 47292 ||  || — || November 8, 1999 || Anderson Mesa || LONEOS || — || align=right | 2.5 km || 
|-id=293 bgcolor=#fefefe
| 47293 Masamitsu || 1999 WO ||  || November 16, 1999 || Kuma Kogen || A. Nakamura || NYS || align=right | 1.7 km || 
|-id=294 bgcolor=#fefefe
| 47294 Blanský les ||  ||  || November 28, 1999 || Kleť || J. Tichá, M. Tichý || FLO || align=right | 2.5 km || 
|-id=295 bgcolor=#fefefe
| 47295 ||  || — || November 25, 1999 || Višnjan Observatory || K. Korlević || NYS || align=right | 1.7 km || 
|-id=296 bgcolor=#E9E9E9
| 47296 ||  || — || November 20, 1999 || Farra d'Isonzo || Farra d'Isonzo || — || align=right | 2.4 km || 
|-id=297 bgcolor=#fefefe
| 47297 ||  || — || November 26, 1999 || Višnjan Observatory || K. Korlević || — || align=right | 3.0 km || 
|-id=298 bgcolor=#fefefe
| 47298 ||  || — || November 27, 1999 || Višnjan Observatory || K. Korlević || — || align=right | 1.5 km || 
|-id=299 bgcolor=#fefefe
| 47299 ||  || — || November 28, 1999 || Oizumi || T. Kobayashi || — || align=right | 2.7 km || 
|-id=300 bgcolor=#fefefe
| 47300 ||  || — || November 28, 1999 || Oizumi || T. Kobayashi || — || align=right | 5.5 km || 
|}

47301–47400 

|-bgcolor=#fefefe
| 47301 ||  || — || November 28, 1999 || Višnjan Observatory || K. Korlević || — || align=right | 2.5 km || 
|-id=302 bgcolor=#fefefe
| 47302 ||  || — || November 28, 1999 || Višnjan Observatory || K. Korlević || V || align=right | 2.2 km || 
|-id=303 bgcolor=#E9E9E9
| 47303 ||  || — || November 29, 1999 || Višnjan Observatory || K. Korlević || EUN || align=right | 5.4 km || 
|-id=304 bgcolor=#E9E9E9
| 47304 ||  || — || November 28, 1999 || Oizumi || T. Kobayashi || — || align=right | 2.9 km || 
|-id=305 bgcolor=#fefefe
| 47305 ||  || — || November 28, 1999 || Kitt Peak || Spacewatch || NYS || align=right | 1.9 km || 
|-id=306 bgcolor=#fefefe
| 47306 ||  || — || December 4, 1999 || Catalina || CSS || — || align=right | 3.1 km || 
|-id=307 bgcolor=#fefefe
| 47307 ||  || — || December 4, 1999 || Catalina || CSS || NYS || align=right | 2.0 km || 
|-id=308 bgcolor=#fefefe
| 47308 ||  || — || December 4, 1999 || Catalina || CSS || — || align=right | 3.3 km || 
|-id=309 bgcolor=#fefefe
| 47309 ||  || — || December 4, 1999 || Catalina || CSS || — || align=right | 3.1 km || 
|-id=310 bgcolor=#E9E9E9
| 47310 ||  || — || December 4, 1999 || Catalina || CSS || — || align=right | 2.7 km || 
|-id=311 bgcolor=#fefefe
| 47311 ||  || — || December 4, 1999 || Fountain Hills || C. W. Juels || NYS || align=right | 2.6 km || 
|-id=312 bgcolor=#fefefe
| 47312 ||  || — || December 3, 1999 || Oizumi || T. Kobayashi || FLO || align=right | 2.7 km || 
|-id=313 bgcolor=#fefefe
| 47313 ||  || — || December 5, 1999 || Catalina || CSS || FLO || align=right | 2.1 km || 
|-id=314 bgcolor=#fefefe
| 47314 ||  || — || December 5, 1999 || Catalina || CSS || — || align=right | 2.6 km || 
|-id=315 bgcolor=#fefefe
| 47315 ||  || — || December 6, 1999 || Catalina || CSS || FLO || align=right | 2.0 km || 
|-id=316 bgcolor=#E9E9E9
| 47316 ||  || — || December 5, 1999 || Socorro || LINEAR || — || align=right | 5.0 km || 
|-id=317 bgcolor=#fefefe
| 47317 ||  || — || December 5, 1999 || Socorro || LINEAR || — || align=right | 2.2 km || 
|-id=318 bgcolor=#E9E9E9
| 47318 ||  || — || December 5, 1999 || Socorro || LINEAR || — || align=right | 4.5 km || 
|-id=319 bgcolor=#E9E9E9
| 47319 ||  || — || December 5, 1999 || Socorro || LINEAR || ADE || align=right | 5.3 km || 
|-id=320 bgcolor=#fefefe
| 47320 ||  || — || December 6, 1999 || Socorro || LINEAR || — || align=right | 4.8 km || 
|-id=321 bgcolor=#fefefe
| 47321 ||  || — || December 5, 1999 || Socorro || LINEAR || — || align=right | 1.9 km || 
|-id=322 bgcolor=#fefefe
| 47322 ||  || — || December 5, 1999 || Socorro || LINEAR || — || align=right | 2.5 km || 
|-id=323 bgcolor=#E9E9E9
| 47323 ||  || — || December 5, 1999 || Socorro || LINEAR || GEF || align=right | 2.8 km || 
|-id=324 bgcolor=#fefefe
| 47324 ||  || — || December 6, 1999 || Socorro || LINEAR || — || align=right | 2.3 km || 
|-id=325 bgcolor=#fefefe
| 47325 ||  || — || December 6, 1999 || Socorro || LINEAR || — || align=right | 1.6 km || 
|-id=326 bgcolor=#fefefe
| 47326 ||  || — || December 6, 1999 || Socorro || LINEAR || V || align=right | 2.4 km || 
|-id=327 bgcolor=#fefefe
| 47327 ||  || — || December 6, 1999 || Socorro || LINEAR || — || align=right | 3.0 km || 
|-id=328 bgcolor=#fefefe
| 47328 ||  || — || December 6, 1999 || Socorro || LINEAR || NYS || align=right | 2.3 km || 
|-id=329 bgcolor=#fefefe
| 47329 ||  || — || December 6, 1999 || Socorro || LINEAR || V || align=right | 2.3 km || 
|-id=330 bgcolor=#E9E9E9
| 47330 ||  || — || December 6, 1999 || Socorro || LINEAR || slow || align=right | 4.5 km || 
|-id=331 bgcolor=#E9E9E9
| 47331 ||  || — || December 6, 1999 || Socorro || LINEAR || — || align=right | 2.5 km || 
|-id=332 bgcolor=#fefefe
| 47332 ||  || — || December 6, 1999 || Socorro || LINEAR || V || align=right | 2.1 km || 
|-id=333 bgcolor=#fefefe
| 47333 ||  || — || December 6, 1999 || Socorro || LINEAR || NYS || align=right | 2.1 km || 
|-id=334 bgcolor=#E9E9E9
| 47334 ||  || — || December 6, 1999 || Socorro || LINEAR || MAR || align=right | 5.7 km || 
|-id=335 bgcolor=#fefefe
| 47335 ||  || — || December 6, 1999 || Socorro || LINEAR || — || align=right | 2.9 km || 
|-id=336 bgcolor=#E9E9E9
| 47336 ||  || — || December 6, 1999 || Socorro || LINEAR || — || align=right | 3.7 km || 
|-id=337 bgcolor=#fefefe
| 47337 ||  || — || December 6, 1999 || Oizumi || T. Kobayashi || V || align=right | 2.5 km || 
|-id=338 bgcolor=#fefefe
| 47338 ||  || — || December 6, 1999 || Oizumi || T. Kobayashi || V || align=right | 2.9 km || 
|-id=339 bgcolor=#E9E9E9
| 47339 ||  || — || December 3, 1999 || Uenohara || N. Kawasato || — || align=right | 2.6 km || 
|-id=340 bgcolor=#fefefe
| 47340 ||  || — || December 6, 1999 || Socorro || LINEAR || — || align=right | 1.8 km || 
|-id=341 bgcolor=#fefefe
| 47341 ||  || — || December 7, 1999 || Socorro || LINEAR || — || align=right | 1.8 km || 
|-id=342 bgcolor=#E9E9E9
| 47342 ||  || — || December 7, 1999 || Socorro || LINEAR || — || align=right | 2.4 km || 
|-id=343 bgcolor=#FA8072
| 47343 ||  || — || December 7, 1999 || Socorro || LINEAR || — || align=right | 2.7 km || 
|-id=344 bgcolor=#fefefe
| 47344 ||  || — || December 7, 1999 || Socorro || LINEAR || NYS || align=right | 3.2 km || 
|-id=345 bgcolor=#fefefe
| 47345 ||  || — || December 7, 1999 || Socorro || LINEAR || FLO || align=right | 1.7 km || 
|-id=346 bgcolor=#E9E9E9
| 47346 ||  || — || December 7, 1999 || Socorro || LINEAR || — || align=right | 2.8 km || 
|-id=347 bgcolor=#fefefe
| 47347 ||  || — || December 7, 1999 || Socorro || LINEAR || V || align=right | 1.9 km || 
|-id=348 bgcolor=#E9E9E9
| 47348 ||  || — || December 7, 1999 || Socorro || LINEAR || — || align=right | 6.5 km || 
|-id=349 bgcolor=#fefefe
| 47349 ||  || — || December 7, 1999 || Socorro || LINEAR || — || align=right | 1.8 km || 
|-id=350 bgcolor=#fefefe
| 47350 ||  || — || December 7, 1999 || Socorro || LINEAR || FLO || align=right | 2.5 km || 
|-id=351 bgcolor=#E9E9E9
| 47351 ||  || — || December 7, 1999 || Socorro || LINEAR || — || align=right | 2.7 km || 
|-id=352 bgcolor=#fefefe
| 47352 ||  || — || December 7, 1999 || Socorro || LINEAR || — || align=right | 1.7 km || 
|-id=353 bgcolor=#fefefe
| 47353 ||  || — || December 7, 1999 || Socorro || LINEAR || NYS || align=right | 4.7 km || 
|-id=354 bgcolor=#fefefe
| 47354 ||  || — || December 7, 1999 || Socorro || LINEAR || FLO || align=right | 2.6 km || 
|-id=355 bgcolor=#fefefe
| 47355 ||  || — || December 7, 1999 || Socorro || LINEAR || MAS || align=right | 2.0 km || 
|-id=356 bgcolor=#fefefe
| 47356 ||  || — || December 7, 1999 || Socorro || LINEAR || — || align=right | 1.7 km || 
|-id=357 bgcolor=#fefefe
| 47357 ||  || — || December 7, 1999 || Socorro || LINEAR || — || align=right | 2.4 km || 
|-id=358 bgcolor=#E9E9E9
| 47358 ||  || — || December 7, 1999 || Socorro || LINEAR || — || align=right | 3.8 km || 
|-id=359 bgcolor=#fefefe
| 47359 ||  || — || December 7, 1999 || Socorro || LINEAR || — || align=right | 1.8 km || 
|-id=360 bgcolor=#fefefe
| 47360 ||  || — || December 7, 1999 || Socorro || LINEAR || — || align=right | 1.6 km || 
|-id=361 bgcolor=#fefefe
| 47361 ||  || — || December 7, 1999 || Socorro || LINEAR || NYS || align=right | 1.3 km || 
|-id=362 bgcolor=#fefefe
| 47362 ||  || — || December 7, 1999 || Socorro || LINEAR || NYS || align=right | 2.3 km || 
|-id=363 bgcolor=#fefefe
| 47363 ||  || — || December 7, 1999 || Socorro || LINEAR || — || align=right | 3.3 km || 
|-id=364 bgcolor=#E9E9E9
| 47364 ||  || — || December 7, 1999 || Socorro || LINEAR || — || align=right | 6.0 km || 
|-id=365 bgcolor=#E9E9E9
| 47365 ||  || — || December 7, 1999 || Socorro || LINEAR || RAF || align=right | 2.7 km || 
|-id=366 bgcolor=#fefefe
| 47366 ||  || — || December 7, 1999 || Socorro || LINEAR || NYS || align=right | 1.9 km || 
|-id=367 bgcolor=#fefefe
| 47367 ||  || — || December 7, 1999 || Socorro || LINEAR || — || align=right | 2.6 km || 
|-id=368 bgcolor=#fefefe
| 47368 ||  || — || December 7, 1999 || Socorro || LINEAR || — || align=right | 2.0 km || 
|-id=369 bgcolor=#fefefe
| 47369 ||  || — || December 7, 1999 || Socorro || LINEAR || V || align=right | 3.6 km || 
|-id=370 bgcolor=#fefefe
| 47370 ||  || — || December 7, 1999 || Socorro || LINEAR || NYS || align=right | 2.2 km || 
|-id=371 bgcolor=#d6d6d6
| 47371 ||  || — || December 7, 1999 || Socorro || LINEAR || — || align=right | 7.6 km || 
|-id=372 bgcolor=#fefefe
| 47372 ||  || — || December 7, 1999 || Socorro || LINEAR || — || align=right | 2.1 km || 
|-id=373 bgcolor=#E9E9E9
| 47373 ||  || — || December 7, 1999 || Socorro || LINEAR || fast? || align=right | 4.0 km || 
|-id=374 bgcolor=#E9E9E9
| 47374 ||  || — || December 7, 1999 || Socorro || LINEAR || — || align=right | 3.6 km || 
|-id=375 bgcolor=#fefefe
| 47375 ||  || — || December 7, 1999 || Socorro || LINEAR || — || align=right | 3.0 km || 
|-id=376 bgcolor=#E9E9E9
| 47376 ||  || — || December 7, 1999 || Socorro || LINEAR || PAD || align=right | 10 km || 
|-id=377 bgcolor=#fefefe
| 47377 ||  || — || December 7, 1999 || Socorro || LINEAR || — || align=right | 6.1 km || 
|-id=378 bgcolor=#fefefe
| 47378 ||  || — || December 7, 1999 || Socorro || LINEAR || — || align=right | 4.3 km || 
|-id=379 bgcolor=#fefefe
| 47379 ||  || — || December 7, 1999 || Socorro || LINEAR || — || align=right | 4.1 km || 
|-id=380 bgcolor=#E9E9E9
| 47380 ||  || — || December 7, 1999 || Socorro || LINEAR || — || align=right | 5.0 km || 
|-id=381 bgcolor=#E9E9E9
| 47381 ||  || — || December 7, 1999 || Socorro || LINEAR || — || align=right | 3.0 km || 
|-id=382 bgcolor=#fefefe
| 47382 ||  || — || December 7, 1999 || Socorro || LINEAR || V || align=right | 3.2 km || 
|-id=383 bgcolor=#fefefe
| 47383 ||  || — || December 7, 1999 || Socorro || LINEAR || FLO || align=right | 2.2 km || 
|-id=384 bgcolor=#fefefe
| 47384 ||  || — || December 7, 1999 || Socorro || LINEAR || — || align=right | 4.3 km || 
|-id=385 bgcolor=#fefefe
| 47385 ||  || — || December 7, 1999 || Socorro || LINEAR || — || align=right | 3.8 km || 
|-id=386 bgcolor=#E9E9E9
| 47386 ||  || — || December 7, 1999 || Socorro || LINEAR || — || align=right | 6.8 km || 
|-id=387 bgcolor=#fefefe
| 47387 ||  || — || December 7, 1999 || Socorro || LINEAR || V || align=right | 1.8 km || 
|-id=388 bgcolor=#E9E9E9
| 47388 ||  || — || December 9, 1999 || Socorro || LINEAR || — || align=right | 5.6 km || 
|-id=389 bgcolor=#fefefe
| 47389 ||  || — || December 4, 1999 || Catalina || CSS || FLO || align=right | 3.4 km || 
|-id=390 bgcolor=#fefefe
| 47390 ||  || — || December 4, 1999 || Catalina || CSS || FLO || align=right | 2.5 km || 
|-id=391 bgcolor=#fefefe
| 47391 ||  || — || December 4, 1999 || Catalina || CSS || FLO || align=right | 1.9 km || 
|-id=392 bgcolor=#fefefe
| 47392 ||  || — || December 4, 1999 || Catalina || CSS || — || align=right | 2.0 km || 
|-id=393 bgcolor=#fefefe
| 47393 ||  || — || December 4, 1999 || Catalina || CSS || NYS || align=right | 1.6 km || 
|-id=394 bgcolor=#fefefe
| 47394 ||  || — || December 4, 1999 || Catalina || CSS || — || align=right | 3.0 km || 
|-id=395 bgcolor=#fefefe
| 47395 ||  || — || December 8, 1999 || Catalina || CSS || — || align=right | 3.1 km || 
|-id=396 bgcolor=#E9E9E9
| 47396 ||  || — || December 11, 1999 || Socorro || LINEAR || EUN || align=right | 4.0 km || 
|-id=397 bgcolor=#fefefe
| 47397 ||  || — || December 5, 1999 || Catalina || CSS || V || align=right | 2.2 km || 
|-id=398 bgcolor=#fefefe
| 47398 ||  || — || December 5, 1999 || Catalina || CSS || V || align=right | 1.9 km || 
|-id=399 bgcolor=#fefefe
| 47399 ||  || — || December 5, 1999 || Catalina || CSS || — || align=right | 2.8 km || 
|-id=400 bgcolor=#fefefe
| 47400 ||  || — || December 5, 1999 || Catalina || CSS || — || align=right | 1.7 km || 
|}

47401–47500 

|-bgcolor=#fefefe
| 47401 ||  || — || December 5, 1999 || Catalina || CSS || — || align=right | 2.6 km || 
|-id=402 bgcolor=#fefefe
| 47402 ||  || — || December 5, 1999 || Catalina || CSS || FLO || align=right | 1.6 km || 
|-id=403 bgcolor=#fefefe
| 47403 ||  || — || December 5, 1999 || Catalina || CSS || — || align=right | 2.2 km || 
|-id=404 bgcolor=#fefefe
| 47404 ||  || — || December 7, 1999 || Catalina || CSS || — || align=right | 2.1 km || 
|-id=405 bgcolor=#fefefe
| 47405 ||  || — || December 7, 1999 || Catalina || CSS || — || align=right | 2.4 km || 
|-id=406 bgcolor=#fefefe
| 47406 ||  || — || December 7, 1999 || Catalina || CSS || V || align=right | 1.7 km || 
|-id=407 bgcolor=#fefefe
| 47407 ||  || — || December 12, 1999 || Socorro || LINEAR || V || align=right | 2.0 km || 
|-id=408 bgcolor=#fefefe
| 47408 ||  || — || December 12, 1999 || Socorro || LINEAR || FLO || align=right | 1.4 km || 
|-id=409 bgcolor=#fefefe
| 47409 ||  || — || December 12, 1999 || Socorro || LINEAR || V || align=right | 2.2 km || 
|-id=410 bgcolor=#fefefe
| 47410 ||  || — || December 6, 1999 || Socorro || LINEAR || — || align=right | 1.8 km || 
|-id=411 bgcolor=#fefefe
| 47411 ||  || — || December 14, 1999 || Fountain Hills || C. W. Juels || FLO || align=right | 1.7 km || 
|-id=412 bgcolor=#E9E9E9
| 47412 ||  || — || December 2, 1999 || Kitt Peak || Spacewatch || — || align=right | 3.7 km || 
|-id=413 bgcolor=#fefefe
| 47413 ||  || — || December 15, 1999 || Oohira || T. Urata || FLO || align=right | 2.5 km || 
|-id=414 bgcolor=#fefefe
| 47414 ||  || — || December 7, 1999 || Kitt Peak || Spacewatch || — || align=right | 4.3 km || 
|-id=415 bgcolor=#E9E9E9
| 47415 ||  || — || December 8, 1999 || Socorro || LINEAR || — || align=right | 4.1 km || 
|-id=416 bgcolor=#fefefe
| 47416 ||  || — || December 8, 1999 || Socorro || LINEAR || FLO || align=right | 4.6 km || 
|-id=417 bgcolor=#fefefe
| 47417 ||  || — || December 8, 1999 || Socorro || LINEAR || — || align=right | 3.8 km || 
|-id=418 bgcolor=#fefefe
| 47418 ||  || — || December 8, 1999 || Socorro || LINEAR || — || align=right | 3.3 km || 
|-id=419 bgcolor=#E9E9E9
| 47419 ||  || — || December 8, 1999 || Socorro || LINEAR || — || align=right | 4.3 km || 
|-id=420 bgcolor=#fefefe
| 47420 ||  || — || December 10, 1999 || Socorro || LINEAR || — || align=right | 3.1 km || 
|-id=421 bgcolor=#fefefe
| 47421 ||  || — || December 10, 1999 || Socorro || LINEAR || V || align=right | 2.0 km || 
|-id=422 bgcolor=#fefefe
| 47422 ||  || — || December 10, 1999 || Socorro || LINEAR || V || align=right | 1.8 km || 
|-id=423 bgcolor=#fefefe
| 47423 ||  || — || December 10, 1999 || Socorro || LINEAR || FLO || align=right | 2.3 km || 
|-id=424 bgcolor=#E9E9E9
| 47424 ||  || — || December 10, 1999 || Socorro || LINEAR || — || align=right | 3.7 km || 
|-id=425 bgcolor=#fefefe
| 47425 ||  || — || December 10, 1999 || Socorro || LINEAR || — || align=right | 3.2 km || 
|-id=426 bgcolor=#E9E9E9
| 47426 ||  || — || December 10, 1999 || Socorro || LINEAR || — || align=right | 2.8 km || 
|-id=427 bgcolor=#fefefe
| 47427 ||  || — || December 10, 1999 || Socorro || LINEAR || — || align=right | 2.6 km || 
|-id=428 bgcolor=#fefefe
| 47428 ||  || — || December 10, 1999 || Socorro || LINEAR || — || align=right | 2.4 km || 
|-id=429 bgcolor=#d6d6d6
| 47429 ||  || — || December 10, 1999 || Socorro || LINEAR || — || align=right | 6.2 km || 
|-id=430 bgcolor=#fefefe
| 47430 ||  || — || December 10, 1999 || Socorro || LINEAR || V || align=right | 2.5 km || 
|-id=431 bgcolor=#fefefe
| 47431 ||  || — || December 10, 1999 || Socorro || LINEAR || V || align=right | 2.9 km || 
|-id=432 bgcolor=#fefefe
| 47432 ||  || — || December 10, 1999 || Socorro || LINEAR || — || align=right | 3.6 km || 
|-id=433 bgcolor=#E9E9E9
| 47433 ||  || — || December 10, 1999 || Socorro || LINEAR || — || align=right | 3.3 km || 
|-id=434 bgcolor=#d6d6d6
| 47434 ||  || — || December 10, 1999 || Socorro || LINEAR || — || align=right | 4.4 km || 
|-id=435 bgcolor=#E9E9E9
| 47435 ||  || — || December 10, 1999 || Socorro || LINEAR || — || align=right | 9.6 km || 
|-id=436 bgcolor=#E9E9E9
| 47436 ||  || — || December 10, 1999 || Socorro || LINEAR || — || align=right | 4.2 km || 
|-id=437 bgcolor=#fefefe
| 47437 ||  || — || December 10, 1999 || Socorro || LINEAR || — || align=right | 3.8 km || 
|-id=438 bgcolor=#fefefe
| 47438 ||  || — || December 10, 1999 || Socorro || LINEAR || FLO || align=right | 2.8 km || 
|-id=439 bgcolor=#E9E9E9
| 47439 ||  || — || December 10, 1999 || Socorro || LINEAR || — || align=right | 3.9 km || 
|-id=440 bgcolor=#fefefe
| 47440 ||  || — || December 12, 1999 || Socorro || LINEAR || FLO || align=right | 2.5 km || 
|-id=441 bgcolor=#fefefe
| 47441 ||  || — || December 12, 1999 || Socorro || LINEAR || V || align=right | 1.8 km || 
|-id=442 bgcolor=#fefefe
| 47442 ||  || — || December 12, 1999 || Socorro || LINEAR || FLO || align=right | 1.8 km || 
|-id=443 bgcolor=#fefefe
| 47443 ||  || — || December 12, 1999 || Socorro || LINEAR || — || align=right | 2.3 km || 
|-id=444 bgcolor=#E9E9E9
| 47444 ||  || — || December 12, 1999 || Socorro || LINEAR || — || align=right | 4.4 km || 
|-id=445 bgcolor=#E9E9E9
| 47445 ||  || — || December 12, 1999 || Socorro || LINEAR || EUN || align=right | 3.8 km || 
|-id=446 bgcolor=#fefefe
| 47446 ||  || — || December 13, 1999 || Socorro || LINEAR || — || align=right | 2.2 km || 
|-id=447 bgcolor=#fefefe
| 47447 ||  || — || December 14, 1999 || Socorro || LINEAR || FLO || align=right | 1.7 km || 
|-id=448 bgcolor=#fefefe
| 47448 ||  || — || December 14, 1999 || Socorro || LINEAR || NYS || align=right | 1.6 km || 
|-id=449 bgcolor=#fefefe
| 47449 ||  || — || December 14, 1999 || Socorro || LINEAR || FLO || align=right | 2.9 km || 
|-id=450 bgcolor=#fefefe
| 47450 ||  || — || December 13, 1999 || Kitt Peak || Spacewatch || — || align=right | 3.2 km || 
|-id=451 bgcolor=#fefefe
| 47451 ||  || — || December 15, 1999 || Socorro || LINEAR || — || align=right | 1.9 km || 
|-id=452 bgcolor=#fefefe
| 47452 ||  || — || December 15, 1999 || Socorro || LINEAR || — || align=right | 2.7 km || 
|-id=453 bgcolor=#fefefe
| 47453 ||  || — || December 15, 1999 || Socorro || LINEAR || — || align=right | 2.4 km || 
|-id=454 bgcolor=#fefefe
| 47454 ||  || — || December 15, 1999 || Socorro || LINEAR || V || align=right | 2.5 km || 
|-id=455 bgcolor=#fefefe
| 47455 ||  || — || December 15, 1999 || Kitt Peak || Spacewatch || — || align=right | 1.7 km || 
|-id=456 bgcolor=#fefefe
| 47456 ||  || — || December 9, 1999 || Catalina || CSS || — || align=right | 7.1 km || 
|-id=457 bgcolor=#E9E9E9
| 47457 ||  || — || December 4, 1999 || Anderson Mesa || LONEOS || — || align=right | 4.8 km || 
|-id=458 bgcolor=#E9E9E9
| 47458 ||  || — || December 4, 1999 || Catalina || CSS || — || align=right | 4.2 km || 
|-id=459 bgcolor=#fefefe
| 47459 ||  || — || December 13, 1999 || Anderson Mesa || LONEOS || — || align=right | 2.5 km || 
|-id=460 bgcolor=#E9E9E9
| 47460 ||  || — || December 13, 1999 || Anderson Mesa || LONEOS || — || align=right | 3.2 km || 
|-id=461 bgcolor=#fefefe
| 47461 ||  || — || December 13, 1999 || Anderson Mesa || LONEOS || — || align=right | 7.1 km || 
|-id=462 bgcolor=#fefefe
| 47462 ||  || — || December 7, 1999 || Catalina || CSS || — || align=right | 2.7 km || 
|-id=463 bgcolor=#fefefe
| 47463 ||  || — || December 8, 1999 || Catalina || CSS || — || align=right | 3.5 km || 
|-id=464 bgcolor=#E9E9E9
| 47464 ||  || — || December 18, 1999 || Socorro || LINEAR || HNS || align=right | 4.7 km || 
|-id=465 bgcolor=#fefefe
| 47465 ||  || — || December 28, 1999 || Prescott || P. G. Comba || — || align=right | 2.7 km || 
|-id=466 bgcolor=#fefefe
| 47466 Mayatoyoshima ||  ||  || December 31, 1999 || Goodricke-Pigott || R. A. Tucker || PHO || align=right | 2.2 km || 
|-id=467 bgcolor=#fefefe
| 47467 ||  || — || December 30, 1999 || Anderson Mesa || LONEOS || V || align=right | 2.5 km || 
|-id=468 bgcolor=#fefefe
| 47468 ||  || — || December 30, 1999 || Višnjan Observatory || K. Korlević || NYS || align=right | 2.6 km || 
|-id=469 bgcolor=#E9E9E9
| 47469 ||  || — || December 30, 1999 || Mauna Kea || C. Veillet || — || align=right | 3.3 km || 
|-id=470 bgcolor=#fefefe
| 47470 || 2000 AF || — || January 2, 2000 || Fountain Hills || C. W. Juels || FLO || align=right | 2.5 km || 
|-id=471 bgcolor=#fefefe
| 47471 || 2000 AM || — || January 2, 2000 || Fountain Hills || C. W. Juels || — || align=right | 3.3 km || 
|-id=472 bgcolor=#E9E9E9
| 47472 ||  || — || January 3, 2000 || Oizumi || T. Kobayashi || MAR || align=right | 3.3 km || 
|-id=473 bgcolor=#fefefe
| 47473 Lorenzopinna ||  ||  || January 1, 2000 || San Marcello || M. Tombelli, A. Boattini || NYS || align=right | 2.4 km || 
|-id=474 bgcolor=#E9E9E9
| 47474 ||  || — || January 3, 2000 || Olathe || Olathe || — || align=right | 3.0 km || 
|-id=475 bgcolor=#fefefe
| 47475 ||  || — || January 2, 2000 || Socorro || LINEAR || V || align=right | 2.5 km || 
|-id=476 bgcolor=#fefefe
| 47476 ||  || — || January 2, 2000 || Socorro || LINEAR || — || align=right | 2.5 km || 
|-id=477 bgcolor=#fefefe
| 47477 ||  || — || January 2, 2000 || Socorro || LINEAR || V || align=right | 2.3 km || 
|-id=478 bgcolor=#fefefe
| 47478 ||  || — || January 3, 2000 || Socorro || LINEAR || — || align=right | 2.5 km || 
|-id=479 bgcolor=#fefefe
| 47479 ||  || — || January 3, 2000 || Socorro || LINEAR || V || align=right | 1.7 km || 
|-id=480 bgcolor=#fefefe
| 47480 ||  || — || January 3, 2000 || Socorro || LINEAR || — || align=right | 3.8 km || 
|-id=481 bgcolor=#E9E9E9
| 47481 ||  || — || January 3, 2000 || Socorro || LINEAR || — || align=right | 2.9 km || 
|-id=482 bgcolor=#E9E9E9
| 47482 ||  || — || January 3, 2000 || Socorro || LINEAR || EUN || align=right | 2.7 km || 
|-id=483 bgcolor=#E9E9E9
| 47483 ||  || — || January 3, 2000 || Socorro || LINEAR || EUN || align=right | 4.7 km || 
|-id=484 bgcolor=#fefefe
| 47484 ||  || — || January 3, 2000 || Socorro || LINEAR || V || align=right | 2.1 km || 
|-id=485 bgcolor=#E9E9E9
| 47485 ||  || — || January 3, 2000 || Socorro || LINEAR || GEF || align=right | 4.5 km || 
|-id=486 bgcolor=#fefefe
| 47486 ||  || — || January 3, 2000 || Socorro || LINEAR || MAS || align=right | 1.5 km || 
|-id=487 bgcolor=#fefefe
| 47487 ||  || — || January 3, 2000 || Socorro || LINEAR || MAS || align=right | 2.6 km || 
|-id=488 bgcolor=#fefefe
| 47488 ||  || — || January 3, 2000 || Socorro || LINEAR || — || align=right | 4.0 km || 
|-id=489 bgcolor=#fefefe
| 47489 ||  || — || January 3, 2000 || Socorro || LINEAR || — || align=right | 5.3 km || 
|-id=490 bgcolor=#fefefe
| 47490 ||  || — || January 3, 2000 || Socorro || LINEAR || — || align=right | 2.0 km || 
|-id=491 bgcolor=#E9E9E9
| 47491 ||  || — || January 3, 2000 || Socorro || LINEAR || — || align=right | 3.7 km || 
|-id=492 bgcolor=#E9E9E9
| 47492 ||  || — || January 3, 2000 || Socorro || LINEAR || — || align=right | 2.6 km || 
|-id=493 bgcolor=#fefefe
| 47493 ||  || — || January 3, 2000 || Socorro || LINEAR || — || align=right | 2.7 km || 
|-id=494 bgcolor=#E9E9E9
| 47494 Gerhardangl ||  ||  || January 4, 2000 || Gnosca || S. Sposetti || — || align=right | 2.2 km || 
|-id=495 bgcolor=#E9E9E9
| 47495 ||  || — || January 5, 2000 || Socorro || LINEAR || — || align=right | 5.7 km || 
|-id=496 bgcolor=#fefefe
| 47496 ||  || — || January 2, 2000 || Kitt Peak || Spacewatch || — || align=right | 2.0 km || 
|-id=497 bgcolor=#fefefe
| 47497 ||  || — || January 2, 2000 || Kitt Peak || Spacewatch || EUT || align=right | 1.9 km || 
|-id=498 bgcolor=#fefefe
| 47498 ||  || — || January 3, 2000 || Socorro || LINEAR || V || align=right | 2.3 km || 
|-id=499 bgcolor=#fefefe
| 47499 ||  || — || January 5, 2000 || Višnjan Observatory || K. Korlević || — || align=right | 2.2 km || 
|-id=500 bgcolor=#E9E9E9
| 47500 ||  || — || January 7, 2000 || Kleť || Kleť Obs. || — || align=right | 2.3 km || 
|}

47501–47600 

|-bgcolor=#E9E9E9
| 47501 ||  || — || January 4, 2000 || Socorro || LINEAR || MAR || align=right | 3.0 km || 
|-id=502 bgcolor=#d6d6d6
| 47502 ||  || — || January 4, 2000 || Socorro || LINEAR || SAN || align=right | 3.6 km || 
|-id=503 bgcolor=#fefefe
| 47503 ||  || — || January 4, 2000 || Socorro || LINEAR || MAS || align=right | 1.7 km || 
|-id=504 bgcolor=#E9E9E9
| 47504 ||  || — || January 4, 2000 || Socorro || LINEAR || — || align=right | 5.9 km || 
|-id=505 bgcolor=#E9E9E9
| 47505 ||  || — || January 4, 2000 || Socorro || LINEAR || WIT || align=right | 2.6 km || 
|-id=506 bgcolor=#fefefe
| 47506 ||  || — || January 4, 2000 || Socorro || LINEAR || fast? || align=right | 4.4 km || 
|-id=507 bgcolor=#fefefe
| 47507 ||  || — || January 4, 2000 || Socorro || LINEAR || NYS || align=right | 2.3 km || 
|-id=508 bgcolor=#E9E9E9
| 47508 ||  || — || January 4, 2000 || Socorro || LINEAR || GEF || align=right | 3.9 km || 
|-id=509 bgcolor=#fefefe
| 47509 ||  || — || January 4, 2000 || Socorro || LINEAR || — || align=right | 2.3 km || 
|-id=510 bgcolor=#E9E9E9
| 47510 ||  || — || January 4, 2000 || Socorro || LINEAR || GEF || align=right | 4.2 km || 
|-id=511 bgcolor=#d6d6d6
| 47511 ||  || — || January 4, 2000 || Socorro || LINEAR || — || align=right | 9.4 km || 
|-id=512 bgcolor=#E9E9E9
| 47512 ||  || — || January 4, 2000 || Socorro || LINEAR || HEN || align=right | 2.9 km || 
|-id=513 bgcolor=#fefefe
| 47513 ||  || — || January 4, 2000 || Socorro || LINEAR || — || align=right | 6.6 km || 
|-id=514 bgcolor=#E9E9E9
| 47514 ||  || — || January 4, 2000 || Socorro || LINEAR || GEF || align=right | 4.6 km || 
|-id=515 bgcolor=#fefefe
| 47515 ||  || — || January 5, 2000 || Socorro || LINEAR || V || align=right | 1.5 km || 
|-id=516 bgcolor=#E9E9E9
| 47516 ||  || — || January 5, 2000 || Socorro || LINEAR || EUN || align=right | 4.8 km || 
|-id=517 bgcolor=#fefefe
| 47517 ||  || — || January 5, 2000 || Socorro || LINEAR || — || align=right | 2.9 km || 
|-id=518 bgcolor=#fefefe
| 47518 ||  || — || January 5, 2000 || Socorro || LINEAR || — || align=right | 2.1 km || 
|-id=519 bgcolor=#fefefe
| 47519 ||  || — || January 5, 2000 || Socorro || LINEAR || — || align=right | 3.6 km || 
|-id=520 bgcolor=#fefefe
| 47520 ||  || — || January 5, 2000 || Socorro || LINEAR || V || align=right | 2.0 km || 
|-id=521 bgcolor=#d6d6d6
| 47521 ||  || — || January 5, 2000 || Socorro || LINEAR || — || align=right | 5.9 km || 
|-id=522 bgcolor=#fefefe
| 47522 ||  || — || January 5, 2000 || Socorro || LINEAR || NYS || align=right | 2.2 km || 
|-id=523 bgcolor=#fefefe
| 47523 ||  || — || January 5, 2000 || Socorro || LINEAR || FLO || align=right | 2.2 km || 
|-id=524 bgcolor=#E9E9E9
| 47524 ||  || — || January 5, 2000 || Socorro || LINEAR || — || align=right | 6.1 km || 
|-id=525 bgcolor=#E9E9E9
| 47525 ||  || — || January 5, 2000 || Socorro || LINEAR || — || align=right | 2.7 km || 
|-id=526 bgcolor=#fefefe
| 47526 ||  || — || January 5, 2000 || Socorro || LINEAR || NYS || align=right | 2.5 km || 
|-id=527 bgcolor=#E9E9E9
| 47527 ||  || — || January 5, 2000 || Socorro || LINEAR || — || align=right | 2.6 km || 
|-id=528 bgcolor=#fefefe
| 47528 ||  || — || January 4, 2000 || Socorro || LINEAR || V || align=right | 1.8 km || 
|-id=529 bgcolor=#E9E9E9
| 47529 ||  || — || January 4, 2000 || Socorro || LINEAR || — || align=right | 6.5 km || 
|-id=530 bgcolor=#E9E9E9
| 47530 ||  || — || January 4, 2000 || Socorro || LINEAR || EUN || align=right | 5.7 km || 
|-id=531 bgcolor=#E9E9E9
| 47531 ||  || — || January 4, 2000 || Socorro || LINEAR || GEF || align=right | 5.0 km || 
|-id=532 bgcolor=#E9E9E9
| 47532 ||  || — || January 4, 2000 || Socorro || LINEAR || EUN || align=right | 5.9 km || 
|-id=533 bgcolor=#E9E9E9
| 47533 ||  || — || January 4, 2000 || Socorro || LINEAR || GEF || align=right | 4.9 km || 
|-id=534 bgcolor=#d6d6d6
| 47534 ||  || — || January 4, 2000 || Socorro || LINEAR || HYG || align=right | 8.8 km || 
|-id=535 bgcolor=#fefefe
| 47535 ||  || — || January 5, 2000 || Socorro || LINEAR || — || align=right | 2.1 km || 
|-id=536 bgcolor=#fefefe
| 47536 ||  || — || January 5, 2000 || Socorro || LINEAR || — || align=right | 3.4 km || 
|-id=537 bgcolor=#E9E9E9
| 47537 ||  || — || January 5, 2000 || Socorro || LINEAR || — || align=right | 3.6 km || 
|-id=538 bgcolor=#E9E9E9
| 47538 ||  || — || January 5, 2000 || Socorro || LINEAR || — || align=right | 3.4 km || 
|-id=539 bgcolor=#E9E9E9
| 47539 ||  || — || January 5, 2000 || Socorro || LINEAR || — || align=right | 4.6 km || 
|-id=540 bgcolor=#fefefe
| 47540 ||  || — || January 5, 2000 || Socorro || LINEAR || — || align=right | 3.0 km || 
|-id=541 bgcolor=#fefefe
| 47541 ||  || — || January 5, 2000 || Socorro || LINEAR || — || align=right | 2.9 km || 
|-id=542 bgcolor=#fefefe
| 47542 ||  || — || January 5, 2000 || Socorro || LINEAR || V || align=right | 2.0 km || 
|-id=543 bgcolor=#fefefe
| 47543 ||  || — || January 5, 2000 || Socorro || LINEAR || — || align=right | 2.5 km || 
|-id=544 bgcolor=#fefefe
| 47544 ||  || — || January 5, 2000 || Socorro || LINEAR || — || align=right | 2.0 km || 
|-id=545 bgcolor=#E9E9E9
| 47545 ||  || — || January 5, 2000 || Socorro || LINEAR || HNS || align=right | 3.0 km || 
|-id=546 bgcolor=#fefefe
| 47546 ||  || — || January 5, 2000 || Socorro || LINEAR || V || align=right | 2.0 km || 
|-id=547 bgcolor=#d6d6d6
| 47547 ||  || — || January 5, 2000 || Socorro || LINEAR || 7:4 || align=right | 9.1 km || 
|-id=548 bgcolor=#E9E9E9
| 47548 ||  || — || January 5, 2000 || Socorro || LINEAR || — || align=right | 5.5 km || 
|-id=549 bgcolor=#E9E9E9
| 47549 ||  || — || January 5, 2000 || Socorro || LINEAR || MAR || align=right | 3.4 km || 
|-id=550 bgcolor=#E9E9E9
| 47550 ||  || — || January 5, 2000 || Socorro || LINEAR || — || align=right | 3.6 km || 
|-id=551 bgcolor=#d6d6d6
| 47551 ||  || — || January 5, 2000 || Socorro || LINEAR || — || align=right | 8.3 km || 
|-id=552 bgcolor=#d6d6d6
| 47552 ||  || — || January 5, 2000 || Socorro || LINEAR || — || align=right | 13 km || 
|-id=553 bgcolor=#fefefe
| 47553 ||  || — || January 5, 2000 || Socorro || LINEAR || NYS || align=right | 2.1 km || 
|-id=554 bgcolor=#d6d6d6
| 47554 ||  || — || January 5, 2000 || Socorro || LINEAR || HYG || align=right | 6.6 km || 
|-id=555 bgcolor=#d6d6d6
| 47555 ||  || — || January 4, 2000 || Socorro || LINEAR || — || align=right | 5.5 km || 
|-id=556 bgcolor=#d6d6d6
| 47556 ||  || — || January 4, 2000 || Socorro || LINEAR || HYG || align=right | 13 km || 
|-id=557 bgcolor=#E9E9E9
| 47557 ||  || — || January 4, 2000 || Socorro || LINEAR || HOF || align=right | 10 km || 
|-id=558 bgcolor=#E9E9E9
| 47558 ||  || — || January 4, 2000 || Socorro || LINEAR || EUN || align=right | 5.3 km || 
|-id=559 bgcolor=#E9E9E9
| 47559 ||  || — || January 5, 2000 || Socorro || LINEAR || DOR || align=right | 9.5 km || 
|-id=560 bgcolor=#d6d6d6
| 47560 ||  || — || January 5, 2000 || Socorro || LINEAR || — || align=right | 10 km || 
|-id=561 bgcolor=#E9E9E9
| 47561 ||  || — || January 4, 2000 || Oizumi || T. Kobayashi || — || align=right | 5.2 km || 
|-id=562 bgcolor=#fefefe
| 47562 ||  || — || January 7, 2000 || Socorro || LINEAR || — || align=right | 3.8 km || 
|-id=563 bgcolor=#E9E9E9
| 47563 ||  || — || January 7, 2000 || Socorro || LINEAR || GEF || align=right | 3.2 km || 
|-id=564 bgcolor=#E9E9E9
| 47564 ||  || — || January 7, 2000 || Socorro || LINEAR || — || align=right | 5.6 km || 
|-id=565 bgcolor=#E9E9E9
| 47565 ||  || — || January 7, 2000 || Socorro || LINEAR || — || align=right | 6.1 km || 
|-id=566 bgcolor=#fefefe
| 47566 ||  || — || January 8, 2000 || Socorro || LINEAR || — || align=right | 5.1 km || 
|-id=567 bgcolor=#E9E9E9
| 47567 ||  || — || January 2, 2000 || Socorro || LINEAR || — || align=right | 5.7 km || 
|-id=568 bgcolor=#fefefe
| 47568 ||  || — || January 3, 2000 || Socorro || LINEAR || FLO || align=right | 3.0 km || 
|-id=569 bgcolor=#d6d6d6
| 47569 ||  || — || January 3, 2000 || Socorro || LINEAR || HYG || align=right | 7.3 km || 
|-id=570 bgcolor=#E9E9E9
| 47570 ||  || — || January 4, 2000 || Socorro || LINEAR || EUN || align=right | 3.4 km || 
|-id=571 bgcolor=#E9E9E9
| 47571 ||  || — || January 4, 2000 || Socorro || LINEAR || — || align=right | 4.0 km || 
|-id=572 bgcolor=#fefefe
| 47572 ||  || — || January 8, 2000 || Socorro || LINEAR || — || align=right | 4.0 km || 
|-id=573 bgcolor=#fefefe
| 47573 ||  || — || January 7, 2000 || Socorro || LINEAR || — || align=right | 2.6 km || 
|-id=574 bgcolor=#E9E9E9
| 47574 ||  || — || January 7, 2000 || Socorro || LINEAR || — || align=right | 3.4 km || 
|-id=575 bgcolor=#fefefe
| 47575 ||  || — || January 7, 2000 || Socorro || LINEAR || V || align=right | 1.8 km || 
|-id=576 bgcolor=#FA8072
| 47576 ||  || — || January 7, 2000 || Socorro || LINEAR || — || align=right | 1.1 km || 
|-id=577 bgcolor=#fefefe
| 47577 ||  || — || January 7, 2000 || Socorro || LINEAR || V || align=right | 1.8 km || 
|-id=578 bgcolor=#fefefe
| 47578 ||  || — || January 7, 2000 || Socorro || LINEAR || — || align=right | 2.6 km || 
|-id=579 bgcolor=#fefefe
| 47579 ||  || — || January 7, 2000 || Socorro || LINEAR || V || align=right | 3.0 km || 
|-id=580 bgcolor=#fefefe
| 47580 ||  || — || January 7, 2000 || Socorro || LINEAR || — || align=right | 2.2 km || 
|-id=581 bgcolor=#FA8072
| 47581 ||  || — || January 7, 2000 || Socorro || LINEAR || — || align=right | 1.8 km || 
|-id=582 bgcolor=#E9E9E9
| 47582 ||  || — || January 7, 2000 || Socorro || LINEAR || EUN || align=right | 4.4 km || 
|-id=583 bgcolor=#E9E9E9
| 47583 ||  || — || January 7, 2000 || Socorro || LINEAR || MAR || align=right | 3.2 km || 
|-id=584 bgcolor=#E9E9E9
| 47584 ||  || — || January 7, 2000 || Socorro || LINEAR || — || align=right | 2.8 km || 
|-id=585 bgcolor=#fefefe
| 47585 ||  || — || January 8, 2000 || Socorro || LINEAR || — || align=right | 4.3 km || 
|-id=586 bgcolor=#E9E9E9
| 47586 ||  || — || January 8, 2000 || Socorro || LINEAR || — || align=right | 5.0 km || 
|-id=587 bgcolor=#E9E9E9
| 47587 ||  || — || January 8, 2000 || Socorro || LINEAR || MAR || align=right | 2.7 km || 
|-id=588 bgcolor=#FA8072
| 47588 ||  || — || January 9, 2000 || Socorro || LINEAR || PHO || align=right | 2.3 km || 
|-id=589 bgcolor=#E9E9E9
| 47589 ||  || — || January 9, 2000 || Socorro || LINEAR || BRU || align=right | 5.9 km || 
|-id=590 bgcolor=#E9E9E9
| 47590 ||  || — || January 10, 2000 || Socorro || LINEAR || — || align=right | 4.4 km || 
|-id=591 bgcolor=#E9E9E9
| 47591 ||  || — || January 10, 2000 || Socorro || LINEAR || — || align=right | 4.4 km || 
|-id=592 bgcolor=#fefefe
| 47592 ||  || — || January 10, 2000 || Socorro || LINEAR || — || align=right | 5.2 km || 
|-id=593 bgcolor=#E9E9E9
| 47593 ||  || — || January 12, 2000 || High Point || D. K. Chesney || — || align=right | 7.6 km || 
|-id=594 bgcolor=#E9E9E9
| 47594 ||  || — || January 8, 2000 || Socorro || LINEAR || EUN || align=right | 4.7 km || 
|-id=595 bgcolor=#d6d6d6
| 47595 ||  || — || January 3, 2000 || Kitt Peak || Spacewatch || THM || align=right | 6.9 km || 
|-id=596 bgcolor=#fefefe
| 47596 ||  || — || January 6, 2000 || Kitt Peak || Spacewatch || MAS || align=right | 1.7 km || 
|-id=597 bgcolor=#E9E9E9
| 47597 ||  || — || January 6, 2000 || Kitt Peak || Spacewatch || — || align=right | 4.5 km || 
|-id=598 bgcolor=#E9E9E9
| 47598 ||  || — || January 7, 2000 || Kitt Peak || Spacewatch || WIT || align=right | 2.8 km || 
|-id=599 bgcolor=#E9E9E9
| 47599 ||  || — || January 7, 2000 || Kitt Peak || Spacewatch || ADE || align=right | 5.6 km || 
|-id=600 bgcolor=#d6d6d6
| 47600 ||  || — || January 10, 2000 || Kitt Peak || Spacewatch || HYG || align=right | 8.4 km || 
|}

47601–47700 

|-bgcolor=#d6d6d6
| 47601 ||  || — || January 10, 2000 || Kitt Peak || Spacewatch || HYG || align=right | 6.1 km || 
|-id=602 bgcolor=#E9E9E9
| 47602 ||  || — || January 4, 2000 || Anderson Mesa || LONEOS || — || align=right | 6.5 km || 
|-id=603 bgcolor=#fefefe
| 47603 ||  || — || January 4, 2000 || Socorro || LINEAR || NYS || align=right | 2.2 km || 
|-id=604 bgcolor=#E9E9E9
| 47604 ||  || — || January 5, 2000 || Anderson Mesa || LONEOS || AER || align=right | 3.7 km || 
|-id=605 bgcolor=#d6d6d6
| 47605 ||  || — || January 5, 2000 || Socorro || LINEAR || — || align=right | 6.4 km || 
|-id=606 bgcolor=#fefefe
| 47606 ||  || — || January 6, 2000 || Anderson Mesa || LONEOS || — || align=right | 3.2 km || 
|-id=607 bgcolor=#E9E9E9
| 47607 ||  || — || January 7, 2000 || Socorro || LINEAR || — || align=right | 4.4 km || 
|-id=608 bgcolor=#d6d6d6
| 47608 ||  || — || January 7, 2000 || Anderson Mesa || LONEOS || EOS || align=right | 9.2 km || 
|-id=609 bgcolor=#d6d6d6
| 47609 ||  || — || January 5, 2000 || Socorro || LINEAR || THM || align=right | 8.4 km || 
|-id=610 bgcolor=#E9E9E9
| 47610 ||  || — || January 6, 2000 || Socorro || LINEAR || — || align=right | 1.9 km || 
|-id=611 bgcolor=#d6d6d6
| 47611 ||  || — || January 26, 2000 || Kitt Peak || Spacewatch || KOR || align=right | 2.8 km || 
|-id=612 bgcolor=#E9E9E9
| 47612 ||  || — || January 21, 2000 || Socorro || LINEAR || — || align=right | 3.6 km || 
|-id=613 bgcolor=#d6d6d6
| 47613 ||  || — || January 28, 2000 || Kitt Peak || Spacewatch || — || align=right | 9.4 km || 
|-id=614 bgcolor=#d6d6d6
| 47614 ||  || — || January 28, 2000 || Oizumi || T. Kobayashi || — || align=right | 11 km || 
|-id=615 bgcolor=#d6d6d6
| 47615 ||  || — || January 27, 2000 || Višnjan Observatory || K. Korlević || THM || align=right | 7.0 km || 
|-id=616 bgcolor=#d6d6d6
| 47616 ||  || — || January 30, 2000 || Socorro || LINEAR || THM || align=right | 9.0 km || 
|-id=617 bgcolor=#E9E9E9
| 47617 ||  || — || January 30, 2000 || Socorro || LINEAR || — || align=right | 5.8 km || 
|-id=618 bgcolor=#E9E9E9
| 47618 ||  || — || January 30, 2000 || Socorro || LINEAR || — || align=right | 5.9 km || 
|-id=619 bgcolor=#d6d6d6
| 47619 Johnpursch ||  ||  || January 30, 2000 || Catalina || CSS || BRA || align=right | 3.9 km || 
|-id=620 bgcolor=#E9E9E9
| 47620 Joeplassmann ||  ||  || January 30, 2000 || Catalina || CSS || RAF || align=right | 2.8 km || 
|-id=621 bgcolor=#E9E9E9
| 47621 ||  || — || January 28, 2000 || Socorro || LINEAR || — || align=right | 4.6 km || 
|-id=622 bgcolor=#E9E9E9
| 47622 ||  || — || January 28, 2000 || Kitt Peak || Spacewatch || AST || align=right | 3.7 km || 
|-id=623 bgcolor=#d6d6d6
| 47623 ||  || — || January 28, 2000 || Kitt Peak || Spacewatch || — || align=right | 4.5 km || 
|-id=624 bgcolor=#d6d6d6
| 47624 ||  || — || January 30, 2000 || Kitt Peak || Spacewatch || — || align=right | 6.0 km || 
|-id=625 bgcolor=#E9E9E9
| 47625 ||  || — || January 26, 2000 || Kitt Peak || Spacewatch || — || align=right | 4.7 km || 
|-id=626 bgcolor=#E9E9E9
| 47626 ||  || — || January 21, 2000 || Socorro || LINEAR || — || align=right | 2.7 km || 
|-id=627 bgcolor=#d6d6d6
| 47627 Kendomanik || 2000 CX ||  || February 1, 2000 || Catalina || CSS || — || align=right | 9.3 km || 
|-id=628 bgcolor=#fefefe
| 47628 ||  || — || February 2, 2000 || Oizumi || T. Kobayashi || — || align=right | 3.7 km || 
|-id=629 bgcolor=#E9E9E9
| 47629 ||  || — || February 2, 2000 || Socorro || LINEAR || — || align=right | 3.7 km || 
|-id=630 bgcolor=#fefefe
| 47630 ||  || — || February 2, 2000 || Socorro || LINEAR || V || align=right | 2.0 km || 
|-id=631 bgcolor=#E9E9E9
| 47631 ||  || — || February 2, 2000 || Socorro || LINEAR || HEN || align=right | 2.7 km || 
|-id=632 bgcolor=#E9E9E9
| 47632 ||  || — || February 2, 2000 || Socorro || LINEAR || — || align=right | 6.7 km || 
|-id=633 bgcolor=#E9E9E9
| 47633 ||  || — || February 2, 2000 || Socorro || LINEAR || — || align=right | 3.5 km || 
|-id=634 bgcolor=#E9E9E9
| 47634 ||  || — || February 2, 2000 || Socorro || LINEAR || — || align=right | 4.2 km || 
|-id=635 bgcolor=#E9E9E9
| 47635 ||  || — || February 2, 2000 || Socorro || LINEAR || — || align=right | 2.5 km || 
|-id=636 bgcolor=#E9E9E9
| 47636 ||  || — || February 2, 2000 || Socorro || LINEAR || — || align=right | 6.2 km || 
|-id=637 bgcolor=#E9E9E9
| 47637 ||  || — || February 2, 2000 || Socorro || LINEAR || — || align=right | 2.6 km || 
|-id=638 bgcolor=#E9E9E9
| 47638 ||  || — || February 2, 2000 || Socorro || LINEAR || — || align=right | 5.4 km || 
|-id=639 bgcolor=#d6d6d6
| 47639 ||  || — || February 2, 2000 || Socorro || LINEAR || THM || align=right | 6.5 km || 
|-id=640 bgcolor=#d6d6d6
| 47640 ||  || — || February 2, 2000 || Socorro || LINEAR || KAR || align=right | 3.3 km || 
|-id=641 bgcolor=#d6d6d6
| 47641 ||  || — || February 2, 2000 || Socorro || LINEAR || VER || align=right | 6.6 km || 
|-id=642 bgcolor=#fefefe
| 47642 ||  || — || February 2, 2000 || Socorro || LINEAR || — || align=right | 2.1 km || 
|-id=643 bgcolor=#d6d6d6
| 47643 ||  || — || February 2, 2000 || Socorro || LINEAR || — || align=right | 6.6 km || 
|-id=644 bgcolor=#d6d6d6
| 47644 ||  || — || February 2, 2000 || Socorro || LINEAR || — || align=right | 12 km || 
|-id=645 bgcolor=#d6d6d6
| 47645 ||  || — || February 2, 2000 || Socorro || LINEAR || EOS || align=right | 7.7 km || 
|-id=646 bgcolor=#d6d6d6
| 47646 ||  || — || February 2, 2000 || Socorro || LINEAR || EOS || align=right | 5.7 km || 
|-id=647 bgcolor=#E9E9E9
| 47647 ||  || — || February 3, 2000 || Socorro || LINEAR || — || align=right | 4.8 km || 
|-id=648 bgcolor=#FA8072
| 47648 ||  || — || February 2, 2000 || Socorro || LINEAR || — || align=right | 2.6 km || 
|-id=649 bgcolor=#d6d6d6
| 47649 Susanbrew ||  ||  || February 1, 2000 || Catalina || CSS || — || align=right | 4.7 km || 
|-id=650 bgcolor=#d6d6d6
| 47650 ||  || — || February 1, 2000 || Catalina || CSS || CHA || align=right | 5.5 km || 
|-id=651 bgcolor=#d6d6d6
| 47651 ||  || — || February 2, 2000 || Socorro || LINEAR || SAN || align=right | 5.4 km || 
|-id=652 bgcolor=#d6d6d6
| 47652 ||  || — || February 2, 2000 || Socorro || LINEAR || — || align=right | 9.6 km || 
|-id=653 bgcolor=#E9E9E9
| 47653 ||  || — || February 2, 2000 || Socorro || LINEAR || — || align=right | 8.2 km || 
|-id=654 bgcolor=#fefefe
| 47654 ||  || — || February 2, 2000 || Socorro || LINEAR || — || align=right | 2.5 km || 
|-id=655 bgcolor=#d6d6d6
| 47655 ||  || — || February 2, 2000 || Socorro || LINEAR || TIR || align=right | 8.2 km || 
|-id=656 bgcolor=#E9E9E9
| 47656 ||  || — || February 2, 2000 || Socorro || LINEAR || — || align=right | 7.1 km || 
|-id=657 bgcolor=#E9E9E9
| 47657 ||  || — || February 2, 2000 || Socorro || LINEAR || GEF || align=right | 4.4 km || 
|-id=658 bgcolor=#d6d6d6
| 47658 ||  || — || February 2, 2000 || Socorro || LINEAR || — || align=right | 3.1 km || 
|-id=659 bgcolor=#E9E9E9
| 47659 ||  || — || February 2, 2000 || Socorro || LINEAR || — || align=right | 4.9 km || 
|-id=660 bgcolor=#E9E9E9
| 47660 ||  || — || February 2, 2000 || Socorro || LINEAR || — || align=right | 5.3 km || 
|-id=661 bgcolor=#E9E9E9
| 47661 ||  || — || February 2, 2000 || Socorro || LINEAR || — || align=right | 6.5 km || 
|-id=662 bgcolor=#d6d6d6
| 47662 ||  || — || February 2, 2000 || Socorro || LINEAR || KOR || align=right | 5.7 km || 
|-id=663 bgcolor=#E9E9E9
| 47663 ||  || — || February 2, 2000 || Socorro || LINEAR || — || align=right | 7.5 km || 
|-id=664 bgcolor=#d6d6d6
| 47664 ||  || — || February 2, 2000 || Socorro || LINEAR || — || align=right | 10 km || 
|-id=665 bgcolor=#E9E9E9
| 47665 ||  || — || February 4, 2000 || Socorro || LINEAR || — || align=right | 4.0 km || 
|-id=666 bgcolor=#d6d6d6
| 47666 ||  || — || February 5, 2000 || Socorro || LINEAR || EOS || align=right | 6.0 km || 
|-id=667 bgcolor=#d6d6d6
| 47667 ||  || — || February 5, 2000 || Socorro || LINEAR || EOS || align=right | 7.5 km || 
|-id=668 bgcolor=#d6d6d6
| 47668 ||  || — || February 2, 2000 || Socorro || LINEAR || — || align=right | 7.9 km || 
|-id=669 bgcolor=#E9E9E9
| 47669 ||  || — || February 2, 2000 || Socorro || LINEAR || WIT || align=right | 3.7 km || 
|-id=670 bgcolor=#E9E9E9
| 47670 ||  || — || February 2, 2000 || Socorro || LINEAR || MAR || align=right | 3.5 km || 
|-id=671 bgcolor=#E9E9E9
| 47671 ||  || — || February 2, 2000 || Socorro || LINEAR || — || align=right | 3.5 km || 
|-id=672 bgcolor=#E9E9E9
| 47672 ||  || — || February 2, 2000 || Socorro || LINEAR || — || align=right | 3.6 km || 
|-id=673 bgcolor=#E9E9E9
| 47673 ||  || — || February 3, 2000 || Socorro || LINEAR || — || align=right | 5.0 km || 
|-id=674 bgcolor=#E9E9E9
| 47674 ||  || — || February 4, 2000 || Socorro || LINEAR || — || align=right | 5.3 km || 
|-id=675 bgcolor=#fefefe
| 47675 ||  || — || February 6, 2000 || Socorro || LINEAR || — || align=right | 2.4 km || 
|-id=676 bgcolor=#d6d6d6
| 47676 ||  || — || February 7, 2000 || Socorro || LINEAR || — || align=right | 8.2 km || 
|-id=677 bgcolor=#E9E9E9
| 47677 ||  || — || February 7, 2000 || Socorro || LINEAR || — || align=right | 3.2 km || 
|-id=678 bgcolor=#d6d6d6
| 47678 ||  || — || February 7, 2000 || Socorro || LINEAR || — || align=right | 16 km || 
|-id=679 bgcolor=#d6d6d6
| 47679 ||  || — || February 10, 2000 || Višnjan Observatory || K. Korlević || THM || align=right | 8.6 km || 
|-id=680 bgcolor=#d6d6d6
| 47680 ||  || — || February 10, 2000 || Višnjan Observatory || K. Korlević || EOS || align=right | 4.8 km || 
|-id=681 bgcolor=#d6d6d6
| 47681 ||  || — || February 7, 2000 || Kitt Peak || Spacewatch || KOR || align=right | 3.5 km || 
|-id=682 bgcolor=#d6d6d6
| 47682 ||  || — || February 4, 2000 || Socorro || LINEAR || — || align=right | 4.3 km || 
|-id=683 bgcolor=#d6d6d6
| 47683 ||  || — || February 4, 2000 || Socorro || LINEAR || — || align=right | 9.2 km || 
|-id=684 bgcolor=#d6d6d6
| 47684 ||  || — || February 4, 2000 || Socorro || LINEAR || — || align=right | 5.3 km || 
|-id=685 bgcolor=#E9E9E9
| 47685 ||  || — || February 4, 2000 || Socorro || LINEAR || RAF || align=right | 4.8 km || 
|-id=686 bgcolor=#d6d6d6
| 47686 ||  || — || February 4, 2000 || Socorro || LINEAR || — || align=right | 7.2 km || 
|-id=687 bgcolor=#d6d6d6
| 47687 ||  || — || February 4, 2000 || Socorro || LINEAR || — || align=right | 4.6 km || 
|-id=688 bgcolor=#fefefe
| 47688 ||  || — || February 4, 2000 || Socorro || LINEAR || — || align=right | 3.5 km || 
|-id=689 bgcolor=#d6d6d6
| 47689 ||  || — || February 6, 2000 || Socorro || LINEAR || — || align=right | 7.0 km || 
|-id=690 bgcolor=#d6d6d6
| 47690 ||  || — || February 6, 2000 || Socorro || LINEAR || HYG || align=right | 7.1 km || 
|-id=691 bgcolor=#d6d6d6
| 47691 ||  || — || February 6, 2000 || Socorro || LINEAR || KOR || align=right | 5.3 km || 
|-id=692 bgcolor=#d6d6d6
| 47692 ||  || — || February 8, 2000 || Socorro || LINEAR || — || align=right | 9.9 km || 
|-id=693 bgcolor=#E9E9E9
| 47693 ||  || — || February 8, 2000 || Socorro || LINEAR || — || align=right | 4.6 km || 
|-id=694 bgcolor=#d6d6d6
| 47694 ||  || — || February 8, 2000 || Socorro || LINEAR || — || align=right | 4.0 km || 
|-id=695 bgcolor=#fefefe
| 47695 ||  || — || February 8, 2000 || Kitt Peak || Spacewatch || NYS || align=right | 1.8 km || 
|-id=696 bgcolor=#d6d6d6
| 47696 ||  || — || February 10, 2000 || Kitt Peak || Spacewatch || EOS || align=right | 3.7 km || 
|-id=697 bgcolor=#E9E9E9
| 47697 ||  || — || February 2, 2000 || Socorro || LINEAR || — || align=right | 5.1 km || 
|-id=698 bgcolor=#E9E9E9
| 47698 ||  || — || February 5, 2000 || Catalina || CSS || — || align=right | 4.4 km || 
|-id=699 bgcolor=#E9E9E9
| 47699 ||  || — || February 3, 2000 || Socorro || LINEAR || — || align=right | 3.4 km || 
|-id=700 bgcolor=#d6d6d6
| 47700 ||  || — || February 3, 2000 || Socorro || LINEAR || KOR || align=right | 3.8 km || 
|}

47701–47800 

|-bgcolor=#E9E9E9
| 47701 ||  || — || February 25, 2000 || Socorro || LINEAR || — || align=right | 7.1 km || 
|-id=702 bgcolor=#E9E9E9
| 47702 ||  || — || February 26, 2000 || Kitt Peak || Spacewatch || — || align=right | 7.6 km || 
|-id=703 bgcolor=#E9E9E9
| 47703 ||  || — || February 27, 2000 || Kitt Peak || Spacewatch || — || align=right | 3.3 km || 
|-id=704 bgcolor=#E9E9E9
| 47704 ||  || — || February 28, 2000 || Socorro || LINEAR || — || align=right | 4.6 km || 
|-id=705 bgcolor=#d6d6d6
| 47705 ||  || — || February 26, 2000 || Kitt Peak || Spacewatch || — || align=right | 5.2 km || 
|-id=706 bgcolor=#d6d6d6
| 47706 ||  || — || February 27, 2000 || Kitt Peak || Spacewatch || EOS || align=right | 5.3 km || 
|-id=707 bgcolor=#E9E9E9
| 47707 Jamieson ||  ||  || February 26, 2000 || Catalina || CSS || EUN || align=right | 5.6 km || 
|-id=708 bgcolor=#d6d6d6
| 47708 Jimhamilton ||  ||  || February 26, 2000 || Catalina || CSS || EOS || align=right | 5.6 km || 
|-id=709 bgcolor=#E9E9E9
| 47709 ||  || — || February 28, 2000 || Višnjan Observatory || K. Korlević || — || align=right | 5.1 km || 
|-id=710 bgcolor=#d6d6d6
| 47710 ||  || — || February 29, 2000 || Višnjan Observatory || K. Korlević || URS || align=right | 12 km || 
|-id=711 bgcolor=#E9E9E9
| 47711 ||  || — || February 29, 2000 || Višnjan Observatory || K. Korlević || INO || align=right | 5.8 km || 
|-id=712 bgcolor=#E9E9E9
| 47712 ||  || — || February 29, 2000 || Socorro || LINEAR || — || align=right | 2.1 km || 
|-id=713 bgcolor=#d6d6d6
| 47713 ||  || — || February 29, 2000 || Socorro || LINEAR || — || align=right | 7.3 km || 
|-id=714 bgcolor=#d6d6d6
| 47714 ||  || — || February 29, 2000 || Socorro || LINEAR || — || align=right | 7.1 km || 
|-id=715 bgcolor=#E9E9E9
| 47715 ||  || — || February 29, 2000 || Socorro || LINEAR || — || align=right | 4.4 km || 
|-id=716 bgcolor=#d6d6d6
| 47716 ||  || — || February 29, 2000 || Socorro || LINEAR || EOS || align=right | 4.4 km || 
|-id=717 bgcolor=#d6d6d6
| 47717 ||  || — || February 29, 2000 || Socorro || LINEAR || — || align=right | 7.1 km || 
|-id=718 bgcolor=#E9E9E9
| 47718 ||  || — || February 29, 2000 || Socorro || LINEAR || AGN || align=right | 2.8 km || 
|-id=719 bgcolor=#d6d6d6
| 47719 ||  || — || February 29, 2000 || Socorro || LINEAR || — || align=right | 6.5 km || 
|-id=720 bgcolor=#d6d6d6
| 47720 ||  || — || February 29, 2000 || Socorro || LINEAR || — || align=right | 6.9 km || 
|-id=721 bgcolor=#E9E9E9
| 47721 ||  || — || February 29, 2000 || Socorro || LINEAR || — || align=right | 5.2 km || 
|-id=722 bgcolor=#d6d6d6
| 47722 ||  || — || February 29, 2000 || Socorro || LINEAR || — || align=right | 5.5 km || 
|-id=723 bgcolor=#d6d6d6
| 47723 ||  || — || February 29, 2000 || Socorro || LINEAR || — || align=right | 3.4 km || 
|-id=724 bgcolor=#d6d6d6
| 47724 ||  || — || February 29, 2000 || Socorro || LINEAR || KOR || align=right | 3.2 km || 
|-id=725 bgcolor=#d6d6d6
| 47725 ||  || — || February 29, 2000 || Socorro || LINEAR || — || align=right | 5.6 km || 
|-id=726 bgcolor=#d6d6d6
| 47726 ||  || — || February 29, 2000 || Socorro || LINEAR || EOS || align=right | 4.1 km || 
|-id=727 bgcolor=#d6d6d6
| 47727 ||  || — || February 29, 2000 || Socorro || LINEAR || THM || align=right | 8.1 km || 
|-id=728 bgcolor=#E9E9E9
| 47728 ||  || — || February 29, 2000 || Socorro || LINEAR || — || align=right | 5.7 km || 
|-id=729 bgcolor=#d6d6d6
| 47729 ||  || — || February 29, 2000 || Socorro || LINEAR || — || align=right | 4.2 km || 
|-id=730 bgcolor=#E9E9E9
| 47730 ||  || — || February 29, 2000 || Socorro || LINEAR || — || align=right | 5.1 km || 
|-id=731 bgcolor=#d6d6d6
| 47731 ||  || — || February 29, 2000 || Socorro || LINEAR || THM || align=right | 6.0 km || 
|-id=732 bgcolor=#d6d6d6
| 47732 ||  || — || February 29, 2000 || Socorro || LINEAR || — || align=right | 7.3 km || 
|-id=733 bgcolor=#d6d6d6
| 47733 ||  || — || February 29, 2000 || Socorro || LINEAR || — || align=right | 3.7 km || 
|-id=734 bgcolor=#E9E9E9
| 47734 ||  || — || February 29, 2000 || Socorro || LINEAR || — || align=right | 4.0 km || 
|-id=735 bgcolor=#d6d6d6
| 47735 ||  || — || February 29, 2000 || Socorro || LINEAR || — || align=right | 16 km || 
|-id=736 bgcolor=#d6d6d6
| 47736 ||  || — || February 29, 2000 || Socorro || LINEAR || THM || align=right | 7.4 km || 
|-id=737 bgcolor=#d6d6d6
| 47737 ||  || — || February 29, 2000 || Socorro || LINEAR || — || align=right | 4.6 km || 
|-id=738 bgcolor=#E9E9E9
| 47738 ||  || — || February 29, 2000 || Socorro || LINEAR || HOF || align=right | 7.0 km || 
|-id=739 bgcolor=#E9E9E9
| 47739 ||  || — || February 29, 2000 || Socorro || LINEAR || — || align=right | 3.6 km || 
|-id=740 bgcolor=#d6d6d6
| 47740 ||  || — || February 29, 2000 || Socorro || LINEAR || — || align=right | 10 km || 
|-id=741 bgcolor=#d6d6d6
| 47741 ||  || — || February 29, 2000 || Socorro || LINEAR || NAE || align=right | 8.6 km || 
|-id=742 bgcolor=#d6d6d6
| 47742 ||  || — || February 29, 2000 || Socorro || LINEAR || THM || align=right | 7.7 km || 
|-id=743 bgcolor=#E9E9E9
| 47743 ||  || — || February 29, 2000 || Socorro || LINEAR || — || align=right | 7.7 km || 
|-id=744 bgcolor=#d6d6d6
| 47744 ||  || — || February 29, 2000 || Socorro || LINEAR || — || align=right | 9.1 km || 
|-id=745 bgcolor=#d6d6d6
| 47745 ||  || — || February 29, 2000 || Socorro || LINEAR || THM || align=right | 9.1 km || 
|-id=746 bgcolor=#d6d6d6
| 47746 ||  || — || February 29, 2000 || Socorro || LINEAR || — || align=right | 4.9 km || 
|-id=747 bgcolor=#E9E9E9
| 47747 ||  || — || February 28, 2000 || Socorro || LINEAR || AER || align=right | 4.6 km || 
|-id=748 bgcolor=#d6d6d6
| 47748 ||  || — || February 28, 2000 || Socorro || LINEAR || — || align=right | 6.7 km || 
|-id=749 bgcolor=#d6d6d6
| 47749 ||  || — || February 28, 2000 || Socorro || LINEAR || — || align=right | 7.5 km || 
|-id=750 bgcolor=#E9E9E9
| 47750 ||  || — || February 29, 2000 || Socorro || LINEAR || MIT || align=right | 6.8 km || 
|-id=751 bgcolor=#E9E9E9
| 47751 ||  || — || February 29, 2000 || Socorro || LINEAR || — || align=right | 2.4 km || 
|-id=752 bgcolor=#E9E9E9
| 47752 ||  || — || February 29, 2000 || Socorro || LINEAR || — || align=right | 8.9 km || 
|-id=753 bgcolor=#E9E9E9
| 47753 ||  || — || February 28, 2000 || Socorro || LINEAR || — || align=right | 4.5 km || 
|-id=754 bgcolor=#d6d6d6
| 47754 ||  || — || February 28, 2000 || Socorro || LINEAR || — || align=right | 5.1 km || 
|-id=755 bgcolor=#E9E9E9
| 47755 ||  || — || February 28, 2000 || Socorro || LINEAR || — || align=right | 3.8 km || 
|-id=756 bgcolor=#E9E9E9
| 47756 ||  || — || February 29, 2000 || Socorro || LINEAR || — || align=right | 4.1 km || 
|-id=757 bgcolor=#E9E9E9
| 47757 ||  || — || February 29, 2000 || Socorro || LINEAR || — || align=right | 2.2 km || 
|-id=758 bgcolor=#d6d6d6
| 47758 ||  || — || February 29, 2000 || Socorro || LINEAR || EOS || align=right | 4.4 km || 
|-id=759 bgcolor=#E9E9E9
| 47759 ||  || — || February 29, 2000 || Socorro || LINEAR || — || align=right | 3.0 km || 
|-id=760 bgcolor=#d6d6d6
| 47760 ||  || — || February 29, 2000 || Socorro || LINEAR || — || align=right | 8.5 km || 
|-id=761 bgcolor=#d6d6d6
| 47761 ||  || — || February 29, 2000 || Socorro || LINEAR || EMA || align=right | 11 km || 
|-id=762 bgcolor=#E9E9E9
| 47762 ||  || — || February 29, 2000 || Socorro || LINEAR || — || align=right | 3.6 km || 
|-id=763 bgcolor=#E9E9E9
| 47763 ||  || — || February 29, 2000 || Socorro || LINEAR || EUN || align=right | 3.9 km || 
|-id=764 bgcolor=#d6d6d6
| 47764 ||  || — || February 29, 2000 || Socorro || LINEAR || EOS || align=right | 4.8 km || 
|-id=765 bgcolor=#d6d6d6
| 47765 ||  || — || February 29, 2000 || Socorro || LINEAR || EOS || align=right | 6.5 km || 
|-id=766 bgcolor=#E9E9E9
| 47766 ||  || — || February 29, 2000 || Socorro || LINEAR || EUN || align=right | 5.5 km || 
|-id=767 bgcolor=#E9E9E9
| 47767 ||  || — || February 29, 2000 || Socorro || LINEAR || — || align=right | 7.8 km || 
|-id=768 bgcolor=#E9E9E9
| 47768 ||  || — || February 29, 2000 || Socorro || LINEAR || — || align=right | 5.9 km || 
|-id=769 bgcolor=#d6d6d6
| 47769 ||  || — || February 29, 2000 || Socorro || LINEAR || — || align=right | 10 km || 
|-id=770 bgcolor=#E9E9E9
| 47770 ||  || — || February 29, 2000 || Socorro || LINEAR || — || align=right | 5.5 km || 
|-id=771 bgcolor=#d6d6d6
| 47771 ||  || — || February 29, 2000 || Socorro || LINEAR || EOS || align=right | 4.7 km || 
|-id=772 bgcolor=#d6d6d6
| 47772 ||  || — || February 29, 2000 || Socorro || LINEAR || KOR || align=right | 3.9 km || 
|-id=773 bgcolor=#d6d6d6
| 47773 ||  || — || February 29, 2000 || Socorro || LINEAR || EOS || align=right | 5.9 km || 
|-id=774 bgcolor=#d6d6d6
| 47774 ||  || — || February 29, 2000 || Socorro || LINEAR || EOS || align=right | 5.4 km || 
|-id=775 bgcolor=#d6d6d6
| 47775 Johnanderson ||  ||  || February 27, 2000 || Catalina || CSS || BRA || align=right | 5.4 km || 
|-id=776 bgcolor=#E9E9E9
| 47776 || 2000 EX || — || March 3, 2000 || Višnjan Observatory || K. Korlević || GEF || align=right | 4.6 km || 
|-id=777 bgcolor=#d6d6d6
| 47777 ||  || — || March 3, 2000 || Socorro || LINEAR || THM || align=right | 8.9 km || 
|-id=778 bgcolor=#d6d6d6
| 47778 ||  || — || March 4, 2000 || Socorro || LINEAR || — || align=right | 6.6 km || 
|-id=779 bgcolor=#d6d6d6
| 47779 ||  || — || March 4, 2000 || Socorro || LINEAR || EOS || align=right | 5.7 km || 
|-id=780 bgcolor=#E9E9E9
| 47780 ||  || — || March 5, 2000 || Socorro || LINEAR || — || align=right | 4.2 km || 
|-id=781 bgcolor=#d6d6d6
| 47781 ||  || — || March 3, 2000 || Socorro || LINEAR || — || align=right | 7.9 km || 
|-id=782 bgcolor=#d6d6d6
| 47782 ||  || — || March 5, 2000 || Socorro || LINEAR || KOR || align=right | 3.3 km || 
|-id=783 bgcolor=#E9E9E9
| 47783 ||  || — || March 5, 2000 || Socorro || LINEAR || GEF || align=right | 4.6 km || 
|-id=784 bgcolor=#d6d6d6
| 47784 ||  || — || March 7, 2000 || Socorro || LINEAR || — || align=right | 12 km || 
|-id=785 bgcolor=#E9E9E9
| 47785 ||  || — || March 3, 2000 || Catalina || CSS || — || align=right | 5.0 km || 
|-id=786 bgcolor=#d6d6d6
| 47786 ||  || — || March 3, 2000 || Catalina || CSS || — || align=right | 18 km || 
|-id=787 bgcolor=#d6d6d6
| 47787 ||  || — || March 8, 2000 || Kitt Peak || Spacewatch || — || align=right | 10 km || 
|-id=788 bgcolor=#d6d6d6
| 47788 ||  || — || March 8, 2000 || Kitt Peak || Spacewatch || — || align=right | 7.4 km || 
|-id=789 bgcolor=#E9E9E9
| 47789 ||  || — || March 8, 2000 || Kitt Peak || Spacewatch || — || align=right | 2.7 km || 
|-id=790 bgcolor=#d6d6d6
| 47790 ||  || — || March 5, 2000 || Socorro || LINEAR || EOS || align=right | 5.1 km || 
|-id=791 bgcolor=#d6d6d6
| 47791 ||  || — || March 5, 2000 || Socorro || LINEAR || EMA || align=right | 11 km || 
|-id=792 bgcolor=#d6d6d6
| 47792 ||  || — || March 5, 2000 || Socorro || LINEAR || — || align=right | 4.3 km || 
|-id=793 bgcolor=#E9E9E9
| 47793 ||  || — || March 5, 2000 || Socorro || LINEAR || — || align=right | 2.6 km || 
|-id=794 bgcolor=#d6d6d6
| 47794 ||  || — || March 8, 2000 || Socorro || LINEAR || — || align=right | 3.9 km || 
|-id=795 bgcolor=#d6d6d6
| 47795 ||  || — || March 8, 2000 || Socorro || LINEAR || — || align=right | 8.5 km || 
|-id=796 bgcolor=#d6d6d6
| 47796 ||  || — || March 8, 2000 || Socorro || LINEAR || — || align=right | 10 km || 
|-id=797 bgcolor=#d6d6d6
| 47797 ||  || — || March 8, 2000 || Socorro || LINEAR || EOS || align=right | 7.3 km || 
|-id=798 bgcolor=#d6d6d6
| 47798 ||  || — || March 9, 2000 || Socorro || LINEAR || EOS || align=right | 7.7 km || 
|-id=799 bgcolor=#E9E9E9
| 47799 ||  || — || March 9, 2000 || Socorro || LINEAR || EUN || align=right | 4.2 km || 
|-id=800 bgcolor=#d6d6d6
| 47800 ||  || — || March 7, 2000 || Višnjan Observatory || K. Korlević || EOS || align=right | 6.3 km || 
|}

47801–47900 

|-bgcolor=#d6d6d6
| 47801 ||  || — || March 10, 2000 || Kitt Peak || Spacewatch || — || align=right | 13 km || 
|-id=802 bgcolor=#d6d6d6
| 47802 ||  || — || March 8, 2000 || Socorro || LINEAR || HYG || align=right | 6.4 km || 
|-id=803 bgcolor=#d6d6d6
| 47803 ||  || — || March 8, 2000 || Socorro || LINEAR || — || align=right | 5.2 km || 
|-id=804 bgcolor=#E9E9E9
| 47804 ||  || — || March 10, 2000 || Socorro || LINEAR || MIS || align=right | 5.9 km || 
|-id=805 bgcolor=#d6d6d6
| 47805 ||  || — || March 10, 2000 || Socorro || LINEAR || — || align=right | 6.8 km || 
|-id=806 bgcolor=#d6d6d6
| 47806 ||  || — || March 10, 2000 || Socorro || LINEAR || — || align=right | 7.8 km || 
|-id=807 bgcolor=#d6d6d6
| 47807 ||  || — || March 10, 2000 || Socorro || LINEAR || EOS || align=right | 5.4 km || 
|-id=808 bgcolor=#d6d6d6
| 47808 ||  || — || March 10, 2000 || Socorro || LINEAR || — || align=right | 7.0 km || 
|-id=809 bgcolor=#fefefe
| 47809 ||  || — || March 5, 2000 || Socorro || LINEAR || NYS || align=right | 1.8 km || 
|-id=810 bgcolor=#E9E9E9
| 47810 ||  || — || March 5, 2000 || Socorro || LINEAR || — || align=right | 2.7 km || 
|-id=811 bgcolor=#d6d6d6
| 47811 ||  || — || March 5, 2000 || Socorro || LINEAR || HYG || align=right | 8.2 km || 
|-id=812 bgcolor=#d6d6d6
| 47812 ||  || — || March 5, 2000 || Socorro || LINEAR || — || align=right | 11 km || 
|-id=813 bgcolor=#d6d6d6
| 47813 ||  || — || March 6, 2000 || Socorro || LINEAR || — || align=right | 5.1 km || 
|-id=814 bgcolor=#d6d6d6
| 47814 ||  || — || March 8, 2000 || Socorro || LINEAR || — || align=right | 9.5 km || 
|-id=815 bgcolor=#d6d6d6
| 47815 ||  || — || March 8, 2000 || Socorro || LINEAR || EOS || align=right | 5.1 km || 
|-id=816 bgcolor=#E9E9E9
| 47816 ||  || — || March 8, 2000 || Socorro || LINEAR || GEF || align=right | 4.0 km || 
|-id=817 bgcolor=#E9E9E9
| 47817 ||  || — || March 9, 2000 || Socorro || LINEAR || — || align=right | 3.0 km || 
|-id=818 bgcolor=#E9E9E9
| 47818 ||  || — || March 9, 2000 || Socorro || LINEAR || GEF || align=right | 5.6 km || 
|-id=819 bgcolor=#d6d6d6
| 47819 ||  || — || March 9, 2000 || Socorro || LINEAR || — || align=right | 6.4 km || 
|-id=820 bgcolor=#d6d6d6
| 47820 ||  || — || March 9, 2000 || Socorro || LINEAR || — || align=right | 5.5 km || 
|-id=821 bgcolor=#E9E9E9
| 47821 ||  || — || March 9, 2000 || Socorro || LINEAR || — || align=right | 3.4 km || 
|-id=822 bgcolor=#E9E9E9
| 47822 ||  || — || March 11, 2000 || Socorro || LINEAR || — || align=right | 8.2 km || 
|-id=823 bgcolor=#d6d6d6
| 47823 ||  || — || March 10, 2000 || Socorro || LINEAR || — || align=right | 10 km || 
|-id=824 bgcolor=#E9E9E9
| 47824 ||  || — || March 11, 2000 || Socorro || LINEAR || — || align=right | 7.9 km || 
|-id=825 bgcolor=#d6d6d6
| 47825 ||  || — || March 12, 2000 || Socorro || LINEAR || EOS || align=right | 5.9 km || 
|-id=826 bgcolor=#d6d6d6
| 47826 ||  || — || March 11, 2000 || Anderson Mesa || LONEOS || — || align=right | 7.7 km || 
|-id=827 bgcolor=#d6d6d6
| 47827 ||  || — || March 11, 2000 || Anderson Mesa || LONEOS || — || align=right | 12 km || 
|-id=828 bgcolor=#d6d6d6
| 47828 ||  || — || March 8, 2000 || Kitt Peak || Spacewatch || 7:4 || align=right | 14 km || 
|-id=829 bgcolor=#E9E9E9
| 47829 ||  || — || March 8, 2000 || Haleakala || NEAT || MAR || align=right | 5.5 km || 
|-id=830 bgcolor=#d6d6d6
| 47830 ||  || — || March 8, 2000 || Haleakala || NEAT || — || align=right | 9.3 km || 
|-id=831 bgcolor=#E9E9E9
| 47831 ||  || — || March 9, 2000 || Socorro || LINEAR || — || align=right | 6.4 km || 
|-id=832 bgcolor=#d6d6d6
| 47832 ||  || — || March 9, 2000 || Socorro || LINEAR || — || align=right | 14 km || 
|-id=833 bgcolor=#d6d6d6
| 47833 ||  || — || March 9, 2000 || Socorro || LINEAR || KOR || align=right | 4.5 km || 
|-id=834 bgcolor=#FA8072
| 47834 ||  || — || March 9, 2000 || Socorro || LINEAR || PHO || align=right | 4.4 km || 
|-id=835 bgcolor=#E9E9E9
| 47835 Stevecoe ||  ||  || March 10, 2000 || Catalina || R. Hill || — || align=right | 4.9 km || 
|-id=836 bgcolor=#d6d6d6
| 47836 ||  || — || March 10, 2000 || Socorro || LINEAR || — || align=right | 8.7 km || 
|-id=837 bgcolor=#d6d6d6
| 47837 ||  || — || March 11, 2000 || Anderson Mesa || LONEOS || — || align=right | 5.8 km || 
|-id=838 bgcolor=#E9E9E9
| 47838 ||  || — || March 11, 2000 || Anderson Mesa || LONEOS || — || align=right | 11 km || 
|-id=839 bgcolor=#d6d6d6
| 47839 ||  || — || March 11, 2000 || Anderson Mesa || LONEOS || EOS || align=right | 6.8 km || 
|-id=840 bgcolor=#d6d6d6
| 47840 ||  || — || March 11, 2000 || Anderson Mesa || LONEOS || EOS || align=right | 4.5 km || 
|-id=841 bgcolor=#E9E9E9
| 47841 ||  || — || March 11, 2000 || Anderson Mesa || LONEOS || — || align=right | 4.7 km || 
|-id=842 bgcolor=#d6d6d6
| 47842 ||  || — || March 11, 2000 || Anderson Mesa || LONEOS || — || align=right | 7.3 km || 
|-id=843 bgcolor=#d6d6d6
| 47843 Maxson ||  ||  || March 11, 2000 || Catalina || CSS || CRO || align=right | 12 km || 
|-id=844 bgcolor=#d6d6d6
| 47844 ||  || — || March 11, 2000 || Anderson Mesa || LONEOS || — || align=right | 6.6 km || 
|-id=845 bgcolor=#d6d6d6
| 47845 ||  || — || March 11, 2000 || Anderson Mesa || LONEOS || EOS || align=right | 5.3 km || 
|-id=846 bgcolor=#d6d6d6
| 47846 ||  || — || March 11, 2000 || Socorro || LINEAR || KOR || align=right | 3.9 km || 
|-id=847 bgcolor=#d6d6d6
| 47847 ||  || — || March 11, 2000 || Anderson Mesa || LONEOS || EOS || align=right | 6.0 km || 
|-id=848 bgcolor=#d6d6d6
| 47848 ||  || — || March 11, 2000 || Socorro || LINEAR || EOS || align=right | 5.3 km || 
|-id=849 bgcolor=#d6d6d6
| 47849 ||  || — || March 11, 2000 || Anderson Mesa || LONEOS || — || align=right | 6.7 km || 
|-id=850 bgcolor=#d6d6d6
| 47850 ||  || — || March 12, 2000 || Socorro || LINEAR || — || align=right | 9.4 km || 
|-id=851 bgcolor=#d6d6d6
| 47851 Budine ||  ||  || March 12, 2000 || Catalina || CSS || TEL || align=right | 4.3 km || 
|-id=852 bgcolor=#fefefe
| 47852 ||  || — || March 2, 2000 || Catalina || CSS || V || align=right | 2.4 km || 
|-id=853 bgcolor=#E9E9E9
| 47853 ||  || — || March 3, 2000 || Catalina || CSS || — || align=right | 5.6 km || 
|-id=854 bgcolor=#E9E9E9
| 47854 ||  || — || March 5, 2000 || Haleakala || NEAT || — || align=right | 6.9 km || 
|-id=855 bgcolor=#d6d6d6
| 47855 ||  || — || March 6, 2000 || Haleakala || NEAT || — || align=right | 6.2 km || 
|-id=856 bgcolor=#d6d6d6
| 47856 ||  || — || March 6, 2000 || Haleakala || NEAT || — || align=right | 4.9 km || 
|-id=857 bgcolor=#d6d6d6
| 47857 ||  || — || March 9, 2000 || Socorro || LINEAR || — || align=right | 6.8 km || 
|-id=858 bgcolor=#d6d6d6
| 47858 ||  || — || March 12, 2000 || Anderson Mesa || LONEOS || EOS || align=right | 8.4 km || 
|-id=859 bgcolor=#E9E9E9
| 47859 ||  || — || March 12, 2000 || Anderson Mesa || LONEOS || EUN || align=right | 4.2 km || 
|-id=860 bgcolor=#E9E9E9
| 47860 ||  || — || March 3, 2000 || Socorro || LINEAR || MRX || align=right | 3.9 km || 
|-id=861 bgcolor=#d6d6d6
| 47861 ||  || — || March 5, 2000 || Socorro || LINEAR || — || align=right | 7.9 km || 
|-id=862 bgcolor=#d6d6d6
| 47862 ||  || — || March 2, 2000 || Catalina || CSS || — || align=right | 6.3 km || 
|-id=863 bgcolor=#d6d6d6
| 47863 ||  || — || March 4, 2000 || Socorro || LINEAR || — || align=right | 7.3 km || 
|-id=864 bgcolor=#d6d6d6
| 47864 ||  || — || March 5, 2000 || Socorro || LINEAR || EOS || align=right | 5.1 km || 
|-id=865 bgcolor=#d6d6d6
| 47865 ||  || — || March 28, 2000 || Socorro || LINEAR || EOS || align=right | 7.2 km || 
|-id=866 bgcolor=#d6d6d6
| 47866 ||  || — || March 25, 2000 || Kitt Peak || Spacewatch || KAR || align=right | 2.3 km || 
|-id=867 bgcolor=#d6d6d6
| 47867 ||  || — || March 25, 2000 || Kitt Peak || Spacewatch || THM || align=right | 6.8 km || 
|-id=868 bgcolor=#E9E9E9
| 47868 ||  || — || March 28, 2000 || Socorro || LINEAR || — || align=right | 5.5 km || 
|-id=869 bgcolor=#E9E9E9
| 47869 ||  || — || March 28, 2000 || Socorro || LINEAR || HNS || align=right | 4.8 km || 
|-id=870 bgcolor=#d6d6d6
| 47870 ||  || — || March 29, 2000 || Socorro || LINEAR || — || align=right | 18 km || 
|-id=871 bgcolor=#E9E9E9
| 47871 ||  || — || March 29, 2000 || Socorro || LINEAR || — || align=right | 3.6 km || 
|-id=872 bgcolor=#E9E9E9
| 47872 ||  || — || March 28, 2000 || Socorro || LINEAR || DOR || align=right | 7.4 km || 
|-id=873 bgcolor=#d6d6d6
| 47873 ||  || — || March 28, 2000 || Socorro || LINEAR || — || align=right | 7.9 km || 
|-id=874 bgcolor=#d6d6d6
| 47874 ||  || — || March 29, 2000 || Socorro || LINEAR || EOS || align=right | 7.0 km || 
|-id=875 bgcolor=#E9E9E9
| 47875 ||  || — || March 29, 2000 || Socorro || LINEAR || GEF || align=right | 4.5 km || 
|-id=876 bgcolor=#E9E9E9
| 47876 ||  || — || March 29, 2000 || Socorro || LINEAR || GEF || align=right | 3.7 km || 
|-id=877 bgcolor=#d6d6d6
| 47877 ||  || — || March 29, 2000 || Socorro || LINEAR || EOS || align=right | 8.0 km || 
|-id=878 bgcolor=#d6d6d6
| 47878 ||  || — || March 26, 2000 || Anderson Mesa || LONEOS || VER || align=right | 9.2 km || 
|-id=879 bgcolor=#d6d6d6
| 47879 ||  || — || March 27, 2000 || Anderson Mesa || LONEOS || EOS || align=right | 5.6 km || 
|-id=880 bgcolor=#E9E9E9
| 47880 ||  || — || March 27, 2000 || Anderson Mesa || LONEOS || — || align=right | 6.9 km || 
|-id=881 bgcolor=#E9E9E9
| 47881 ||  || — || March 27, 2000 || Anderson Mesa || LONEOS || — || align=right | 4.4 km || 
|-id=882 bgcolor=#d6d6d6
| 47882 ||  || — || March 29, 2000 || Socorro || LINEAR || — || align=right | 9.0 km || 
|-id=883 bgcolor=#E9E9E9
| 47883 ||  || — || March 29, 2000 || Socorro || LINEAR || — || align=right | 5.2 km || 
|-id=884 bgcolor=#E9E9E9
| 47884 ||  || — || March 29, 2000 || Socorro || LINEAR || GEF || align=right | 3.4 km || 
|-id=885 bgcolor=#d6d6d6
| 47885 ||  || — || March 29, 2000 || Socorro || LINEAR || — || align=right | 7.9 km || 
|-id=886 bgcolor=#d6d6d6
| 47886 ||  || — || March 28, 2000 || Socorro || LINEAR || — || align=right | 4.5 km || 
|-id=887 bgcolor=#d6d6d6
| 47887 ||  || — || March 28, 2000 || Socorro || LINEAR || — || align=right | 4.1 km || 
|-id=888 bgcolor=#d6d6d6
| 47888 ||  || — || March 29, 2000 || Socorro || LINEAR || — || align=right | 10 km || 
|-id=889 bgcolor=#d6d6d6
| 47889 ||  || — || March 29, 2000 || Socorro || LINEAR || — || align=right | 10 km || 
|-id=890 bgcolor=#d6d6d6
| 47890 ||  || — || March 30, 2000 || Socorro || LINEAR || — || align=right | 13 km || 
|-id=891 bgcolor=#d6d6d6
| 47891 García-Migani ||  ||  || March 27, 2000 || Anderson Mesa || LONEOS || THM || align=right | 6.0 km || 
|-id=892 bgcolor=#d6d6d6
| 47892 ||  || — || April 4, 2000 || Socorro || LINEAR || HYG || align=right | 7.2 km || 
|-id=893 bgcolor=#d6d6d6
| 47893 ||  || — || April 5, 2000 || Socorro || LINEAR || EOS || align=right | 6.3 km || 
|-id=894 bgcolor=#E9E9E9
| 47894 ||  || — || April 5, 2000 || Socorro || LINEAR || — || align=right | 5.3 km || 
|-id=895 bgcolor=#E9E9E9
| 47895 ||  || — || April 5, 2000 || Socorro || LINEAR || — || align=right | 2.1 km || 
|-id=896 bgcolor=#d6d6d6
| 47896 ||  || — || April 5, 2000 || Socorro || LINEAR || — || align=right | 9.0 km || 
|-id=897 bgcolor=#E9E9E9
| 47897 ||  || — || April 5, 2000 || Socorro || LINEAR || — || align=right | 5.0 km || 
|-id=898 bgcolor=#d6d6d6
| 47898 ||  || — || April 5, 2000 || Socorro || LINEAR || SAN || align=right | 8.1 km || 
|-id=899 bgcolor=#d6d6d6
| 47899 ||  || — || April 5, 2000 || Socorro || LINEAR || — || align=right | 6.6 km || 
|-id=900 bgcolor=#d6d6d6
| 47900 ||  || — || April 5, 2000 || Socorro || LINEAR || — || align=right | 6.7 km || 
|}

47901–48000 

|-bgcolor=#d6d6d6
| 47901 ||  || — || April 5, 2000 || Socorro || LINEAR || URS || align=right | 9.5 km || 
|-id=902 bgcolor=#d6d6d6
| 47902 ||  || — || April 5, 2000 || Socorro || LINEAR || — || align=right | 7.9 km || 
|-id=903 bgcolor=#d6d6d6
| 47903 ||  || — || April 5, 2000 || Socorro || LINEAR || — || align=right | 10 km || 
|-id=904 bgcolor=#d6d6d6
| 47904 ||  || — || April 5, 2000 || Socorro || LINEAR || THM || align=right | 7.2 km || 
|-id=905 bgcolor=#d6d6d6
| 47905 ||  || — || April 5, 2000 || Socorro || LINEAR || THM || align=right | 8.1 km || 
|-id=906 bgcolor=#d6d6d6
| 47906 ||  || — || April 5, 2000 || Socorro || LINEAR || — || align=right | 6.0 km || 
|-id=907 bgcolor=#d6d6d6
| 47907 ||  || — || April 5, 2000 || Socorro || LINEAR || 3:2 || align=right | 15 km || 
|-id=908 bgcolor=#E9E9E9
| 47908 ||  || — || April 5, 2000 || Socorro || LINEAR || — || align=right | 4.3 km || 
|-id=909 bgcolor=#d6d6d6
| 47909 ||  || — || April 5, 2000 || Socorro || LINEAR || — || align=right | 6.6 km || 
|-id=910 bgcolor=#d6d6d6
| 47910 ||  || — || April 5, 2000 || Socorro || LINEAR || — || align=right | 7.9 km || 
|-id=911 bgcolor=#d6d6d6
| 47911 ||  || — || April 5, 2000 || Socorro || LINEAR || EOS || align=right | 6.7 km || 
|-id=912 bgcolor=#d6d6d6
| 47912 ||  || — || April 6, 2000 || Socorro || LINEAR || — || align=right | 6.2 km || 
|-id=913 bgcolor=#E9E9E9
| 47913 ||  || — || April 6, 2000 || Socorro || LINEAR || — || align=right | 8.1 km || 
|-id=914 bgcolor=#d6d6d6
| 47914 ||  || — || April 4, 2000 || Socorro || LINEAR || — || align=right | 6.9 km || 
|-id=915 bgcolor=#E9E9E9
| 47915 ||  || — || April 4, 2000 || Socorro || LINEAR || — || align=right | 4.5 km || 
|-id=916 bgcolor=#d6d6d6
| 47916 ||  || — || April 7, 2000 || Socorro || LINEAR || — || align=right | 6.6 km || 
|-id=917 bgcolor=#E9E9E9
| 47917 ||  || — || April 7, 2000 || Socorro || LINEAR || EUN || align=right | 5.3 km || 
|-id=918 bgcolor=#d6d6d6
| 47918 ||  || — || April 7, 2000 || Socorro || LINEAR || — || align=right | 6.8 km || 
|-id=919 bgcolor=#d6d6d6
| 47919 ||  || — || April 7, 2000 || Socorro || LINEAR || — || align=right | 5.9 km || 
|-id=920 bgcolor=#d6d6d6
| 47920 ||  || — || April 7, 2000 || Socorro || LINEAR || THM || align=right | 11 km || 
|-id=921 bgcolor=#E9E9E9
| 47921 ||  || — || April 7, 2000 || Socorro || LINEAR || GEF || align=right | 4.6 km || 
|-id=922 bgcolor=#d6d6d6
| 47922 ||  || — || April 7, 2000 || Socorro || LINEAR || EOS || align=right | 6.9 km || 
|-id=923 bgcolor=#d6d6d6
| 47923 ||  || — || April 3, 2000 || Anderson Mesa || LONEOS || — || align=right | 10 km || 
|-id=924 bgcolor=#d6d6d6
| 47924 ||  || — || April 7, 2000 || Socorro || LINEAR || JLI || align=right | 6.0 km || 
|-id=925 bgcolor=#E9E9E9
| 47925 ||  || — || April 2, 2000 || Kitt Peak || Spacewatch || — || align=right | 2.8 km || 
|-id=926 bgcolor=#E9E9E9
| 47926 ||  || — || April 8, 2000 || Socorro || LINEAR || — || align=right | 4.4 km || 
|-id=927 bgcolor=#d6d6d6
| 47927 ||  || — || April 5, 2000 || Socorro || LINEAR || THM || align=right | 6.2 km || 
|-id=928 bgcolor=#d6d6d6
| 47928 ||  || — || April 6, 2000 || Anderson Mesa || LONEOS || — || align=right | 10 km || 
|-id=929 bgcolor=#E9E9E9
| 47929 ||  || — || April 6, 2000 || Socorro || LINEAR || GEF || align=right | 4.5 km || 
|-id=930 bgcolor=#d6d6d6
| 47930 ||  || — || April 7, 2000 || Socorro || LINEAR || — || align=right | 12 km || 
|-id=931 bgcolor=#d6d6d6
| 47931 ||  || — || April 4, 2000 || Anderson Mesa || LONEOS || — || align=right | 8.3 km || 
|-id=932 bgcolor=#C2E0FF
| 47932 ||  || — || April 1, 2000 || Steward Observatory || A. Gleason || plutinocritical || align=right | 255 km || 
|-id=933 bgcolor=#d6d6d6
| 47933 ||  || — || April 27, 2000 || Socorro || LINEAR || — || align=right | 6.9 km || 
|-id=934 bgcolor=#d6d6d6
| 47934 ||  || — || April 27, 2000 || Socorro || LINEAR || — || align=right | 10 km || 
|-id=935 bgcolor=#E9E9E9
| 47935 ||  || — || April 28, 2000 || Socorro || LINEAR || — || align=right | 3.6 km || 
|-id=936 bgcolor=#d6d6d6
| 47936 ||  || — || April 28, 2000 || Socorro || LINEAR || — || align=right | 6.8 km || 
|-id=937 bgcolor=#d6d6d6
| 47937 ||  || — || April 25, 2000 || Anderson Mesa || LONEOS || — || align=right | 6.3 km || 
|-id=938 bgcolor=#d6d6d6
| 47938 ||  || — || April 26, 2000 || Anderson Mesa || LONEOS || KOR || align=right | 4.3 km || 
|-id=939 bgcolor=#E9E9E9
| 47939 ||  || — || April 25, 2000 || Kitt Peak || Spacewatch || — || align=right | 7.5 km || 
|-id=940 bgcolor=#d6d6d6
| 47940 ||  || — || April 25, 2000 || Anderson Mesa || LONEOS || URS || align=right | 14 km || 
|-id=941 bgcolor=#d6d6d6
| 47941 ||  || — || April 25, 2000 || Anderson Mesa || LONEOS || 3:2 || align=right | 12 km || 
|-id=942 bgcolor=#d6d6d6
| 47942 ||  || — || April 27, 2000 || Socorro || LINEAR || — || align=right | 11 km || 
|-id=943 bgcolor=#d6d6d6
| 47943 ||  || — || April 28, 2000 || Socorro || LINEAR || EOS || align=right | 6.3 km || 
|-id=944 bgcolor=#d6d6d6
| 47944 ||  || — || May 5, 2000 || Socorro || LINEAR || THM || align=right | 9.7 km || 
|-id=945 bgcolor=#d6d6d6
| 47945 ||  || — || May 3, 2000 || Socorro || LINEAR || ALA || align=right | 11 km || 
|-id=946 bgcolor=#d6d6d6
| 47946 ||  || — || May 9, 2000 || Socorro || LINEAR || ALA || align=right | 18 km || 
|-id=947 bgcolor=#E9E9E9
| 47947 ||  || — || May 2, 2000 || Anderson Mesa || LONEOS || HNS || align=right | 4.2 km || 
|-id=948 bgcolor=#d6d6d6
| 47948 ||  || — || May 28, 2000 || Socorro || LINEAR || — || align=right | 11 km || 
|-id=949 bgcolor=#d6d6d6
| 47949 ||  || — || May 27, 2000 || Socorro || LINEAR || HYG || align=right | 8.0 km || 
|-id=950 bgcolor=#E9E9E9
| 47950 || 2000 MP || — || June 24, 2000 || Kitt Peak || Spacewatch || — || align=right | 3.4 km || 
|-id=951 bgcolor=#E9E9E9
| 47951 ||  || — || July 23, 2000 || Socorro || LINEAR || — || align=right | 8.6 km || 
|-id=952 bgcolor=#fefefe
| 47952 ||  || — || July 23, 2000 || Socorro || LINEAR || NYS || align=right | 5.3 km || 
|-id=953 bgcolor=#d6d6d6
| 47953 ||  || — || August 24, 2000 || Socorro || LINEAR || KOR || align=right | 2.8 km || 
|-id=954 bgcolor=#fefefe
| 47954 ||  || — || August 24, 2000 || Socorro || LINEAR || — || align=right | 2.0 km || 
|-id=955 bgcolor=#C2FFFF
| 47955 ||  || — || August 24, 2000 || Socorro || LINEAR || L5 || align=right | 21 km || 
|-id=956 bgcolor=#C2FFFF
| 47956 ||  || — || August 28, 2000 || Socorro || LINEAR || L5 || align=right | 19 km || 
|-id=957 bgcolor=#C2FFFF
| 47957 ||  || — || August 28, 2000 || Socorro || LINEAR || L5 || align=right | 27 km || 
|-id=958 bgcolor=#fefefe
| 47958 ||  || — || August 31, 2000 || Socorro || LINEAR || V || align=right | 1.7 km || 
|-id=959 bgcolor=#C2FFFF
| 47959 ||  || — || August 31, 2000 || Socorro || LINEAR || L5 || align=right | 13 km || 
|-id=960 bgcolor=#fefefe
| 47960 ||  || — || September 3, 2000 || Socorro || LINEAR || — || align=right | 2.8 km || 
|-id=961 bgcolor=#fefefe
| 47961 ||  || — || September 2, 2000 || Socorro || LINEAR || V || align=right | 1.8 km || 
|-id=962 bgcolor=#C2FFFF
| 47962 ||  || — || September 2, 2000 || Socorro || LINEAR || L5 || align=right | 24 km || 
|-id=963 bgcolor=#C2FFFF
| 47963 ||  || — || September 24, 2000 || Socorro || LINEAR || L5 || align=right | 27 km || 
|-id=964 bgcolor=#C2FFFF
| 47964 ||  || — || September 22, 2000 || Socorro || LINEAR || L5 || align=right | 17 km || 
|-id=965 bgcolor=#fefefe
| 47965 ||  || — || September 24, 2000 || Socorro || LINEAR || NYS || align=right | 2.1 km || 
|-id=966 bgcolor=#fefefe
| 47966 ||  || — || September 24, 2000 || Socorro || LINEAR || H || align=right | 1.1 km || 
|-id=967 bgcolor=#C2FFFF
| 47967 ||  || — || September 28, 2000 || Socorro || LINEAR || L5 || align=right | 21 km || 
|-id=968 bgcolor=#fefefe
| 47968 ||  || — || October 1, 2000 || Anderson Mesa || LONEOS || H || align=right | 1.7 km || 
|-id=969 bgcolor=#C2FFFF
| 47969 ||  || — || October 5, 2000 || Socorro || LINEAR || L5 || align=right | 23 km || 
|-id=970 bgcolor=#fefefe
| 47970 ||  || — || October 25, 2000 || Socorro || LINEAR || V || align=right | 1.7 km || 
|-id=971 bgcolor=#d6d6d6
| 47971 ||  || — || November 1, 2000 || Socorro || LINEAR || — || align=right | 6.4 km || 
|-id=972 bgcolor=#d6d6d6
| 47972 ||  || — || November 1, 2000 || Socorro || LINEAR || ANF || align=right | 4.6 km || 
|-id=973 bgcolor=#fefefe
| 47973 ||  || — || November 3, 2000 || Socorro || LINEAR || — || align=right | 2.5 km || 
|-id=974 bgcolor=#fefefe
| 47974 ||  || — || November 20, 2000 || Socorro || LINEAR || V || align=right | 1.6 km || 
|-id=975 bgcolor=#fefefe
| 47975 ||  || — || November 21, 2000 || Socorro || LINEAR || FLO || align=right | 1.7 km || 
|-id=976 bgcolor=#fefefe
| 47976 ||  || — || November 20, 2000 || Socorro || LINEAR || — || align=right | 2.0 km || 
|-id=977 bgcolor=#d6d6d6
| 47977 ||  || — || November 30, 2000 || Socorro || LINEAR || EOS || align=right | 4.1 km || 
|-id=978 bgcolor=#d6d6d6
| 47978 ||  || — || November 24, 2000 || Anderson Mesa || LONEOS || — || align=right | 6.5 km || 
|-id=979 bgcolor=#E9E9E9
| 47979 ||  || — || November 25, 2000 || Socorro || LINEAR || — || align=right | 9.2 km || 
|-id=980 bgcolor=#fefefe
| 47980 ||  || — || November 26, 2000 || Socorro || LINEAR || — || align=right | 2.8 km || 
|-id=981 bgcolor=#d6d6d6
| 47981 ||  || — || November 30, 2000 || Gnosca || S. Sposetti || KOR || align=right | 3.4 km || 
|-id=982 bgcolor=#d6d6d6
| 47982 ||  || — || November 16, 2000 || Anderson Mesa || LONEOS || — || align=right | 7.8 km || 
|-id=983 bgcolor=#fefefe
| 47983 ||  || — || December 4, 2000 || Socorro || LINEAR || H || align=right | 2.2 km || 
|-id=984 bgcolor=#fefefe
| 47984 ||  || — || December 4, 2000 || Socorro || LINEAR || — || align=right | 2.1 km || 
|-id=985 bgcolor=#E9E9E9
| 47985 ||  || — || December 5, 2000 || Socorro || LINEAR || BAR || align=right | 3.9 km || 
|-id=986 bgcolor=#fefefe
| 47986 ||  || — || December 18, 2000 || Kitt Peak || Spacewatch || FLO || align=right | 1.7 km || 
|-id=987 bgcolor=#E9E9E9
| 47987 ||  || — || December 20, 2000 || Kitt Peak || Spacewatch || — || align=right | 2.4 km || 
|-id=988 bgcolor=#d6d6d6
| 47988 ||  || — || December 22, 2000 || Socorro || LINEAR || — || align=right | 4.2 km || 
|-id=989 bgcolor=#fefefe
| 47989 ||  || — || December 28, 2000 || Socorro || LINEAR || — || align=right | 2.4 km || 
|-id=990 bgcolor=#fefefe
| 47990 ||  || — || December 28, 2000 || Socorro || LINEAR || — || align=right | 1.7 km || 
|-id=991 bgcolor=#E9E9E9
| 47991 ||  || — || December 30, 2000 || Socorro || LINEAR || AGN || align=right | 2.9 km || 
|-id=992 bgcolor=#fefefe
| 47992 ||  || — || December 28, 2000 || Socorro || LINEAR || NYS || align=right | 2.0 km || 
|-id=993 bgcolor=#fefefe
| 47993 ||  || — || December 28, 2000 || Socorro || LINEAR || — || align=right | 2.9 km || 
|-id=994 bgcolor=#fefefe
| 47994 ||  || — || December 30, 2000 || Socorro || LINEAR || — || align=right | 2.4 km || 
|-id=995 bgcolor=#d6d6d6
| 47995 ||  || — || December 30, 2000 || Anderson Mesa || LONEOS || — || align=right | 7.7 km || 
|-id=996 bgcolor=#fefefe
| 47996 ||  || — || December 31, 2000 || Anderson Mesa || LONEOS || PHO || align=right | 2.8 km || 
|-id=997 bgcolor=#E9E9E9
| 47997 ||  || — || January 2, 2001 || Socorro || LINEAR || — || align=right | 2.2 km || 
|-id=998 bgcolor=#fefefe
| 47998 ||  || — || January 15, 2001 || Oizumi || T. Kobayashi || NYS || align=right | 1.9 km || 
|-id=999 bgcolor=#fefefe
| 47999 ||  || — || January 19, 2001 || Socorro || LINEAR || — || align=right | 2.1 km || 
|-id=000 bgcolor=#fefefe
| 48000 ||  || — || January 21, 2001 || Socorro || LINEAR || — || align=right | 1.6 km || 
|}

References

External links 
 Discovery Circumstances: Numbered Minor Planets (45001)–(50000) (IAU Minor Planet Center)

0047